= Byrhtnoth =

10th-century English nobleman

Ealdorman of Essex
- In office c. 956 – 11 August 991
- Preceded by: Byrhtferth

Personal details
- Born: c. 931
- Died: 11 August 991 Maldon, Essex
- Spouse(s): Ælfflaed, daughter of Ælfgar
- Children: Leofflaed

Byrhtnoth (Note: The Anglo-Saxon name element Beorht has multiple variants. Byrhtnoth is the most common spelling of his name, which was widespread in the late tenth century. His name is also spelled Brihtnoth, and less commonly Beorhtnoth, in particular by J.R.R. Tolkien.) (Old English: Byrhtnōð; c. 931 – 11 August 991) was a 10th-century Anglo-Saxon magnate who governed as the ealdorman of Essex from late 956 until he died in battle. Byrhtnoth was initially appointed by King Eadwig and supported the young ruler, but after the kingdom was partitioned in 957, he and his lands were under Eadwig's younger brother Edgar, who was ruling England north of the Thames. After Eadwig died, the kingdom was unified, and Byrhtnoth was one of four leaders of Edgar's administration, alongside Æthelwine of East Anglia, Ælfhere of Mercia, and Oslac of York. Byrhtnoth was one of the wealthiest men in the kingdom and a prolific supporter of monasticism, causing monastic writers to celebrate his piety. There was disorder after Edgar's death, with a large-scale reclamation of land from the monasteries. Byrhtferth of Ramsey praised Byrhtnoth and Æthelwine for their defence of the monasteries Edgar's teenage son Edward replaced him after a power struggle, and Byrhtnoth was loyal to the young king, but Edward was murdered in 978. He was succeeded by his younger brother Æthelred, who was crowned after a year. Byrhtnoth was an experienced ealdorman under Æthelred, and Æthelwine's illness in 991 made Byrhtnoth the most senior ealdorman in England.

After a lull lasting decades, Viking attacks started up again in the 980s, commencing the so-called "Second Viking Age". Raids took place from 980–982 and in 988, but these early attacks do not seem to penetrate far. A band of Vikings probably led by Olaf Tryggvason landed on English shores in 991, devastating Ipswich, and Byrhtnoth marched out to meet them at the Battle of Maldon. He seems to have been greatly outnumbered, but the Vikings were contained on a causeway, which the more professional troops among Byrhtnoth's host could defend easily. Byrhtnoth gave up this advantage to meet the Vikings directly in battle, and in the ensuing engagement he was defeated and killed.

Byrhtnoth was celebrated for his bravery and religiosity in the accounts of the battle by monastic chroniclers as well as the poet of The Battle of Maldon, which is our main source on the engagement. However, the poem implies criticism of his decision to fight the Vikings on equal terms. Later scholars disagree on this decision, with some being condemnatory, and others arguing that the Vikings had to be destroyed there unless they plunder elsewhere. Byrhtnoth was also known for his immense size; earlier estimates placed him at 6 ft 9 in (2.06 m), but he was probably just over six feet. He is the subject of J.R.R. Tolkien's short play in verse, The Homecoming of Beorhtnoth, Beorhthelm's Son; and a modern statue at Maldon.

== Sources ==
The Anglo-Saxon Chronicle (also known as ASC or Chronicle) likely originated in the late ninth century, under the rule of Alfred the Great. Although it is the most important source for Anglo-Saxon political history, it only mentions Byrhtnoth in the entry for 991. There are references to Byrhtnoth in monastic texts such as those from Ely and Ramsey, as well as the near-contemporary Byrhtferth of Ramsey, the author of the Vita Oswaldi, who wished to continue his legacy. The most detailed source on Byrhtnoth, and the basis of his fame, is the 325-line fragment of the Old English poem, The Battle of Maldon.

It was common for battle poems to be composed shortly after the events they describe, and scholars essentially accepted that The Battle of Maldon was as well, with the year 1000 being accepted as the latest possible date. This began to change starting in the 1960s. George Clark argued in 1968 that "little hard evidence connects our text with the period or locale of the actual battle." He concludes that the poem is probably "imaginative literature," composed for an audience around the middle of the 11th-century. John McKinnell noted that the poet frequently referred to Byrhtnoth as eorl, a term which came into England during Cnut, and he believed a dating around 1020 is more parsimonious, which received some support. Norman Blake went further, believing that the poem was produced no earlier than 1030. Others are not convinced, arguing that eorl may refer to his command in battle, or was likely in common use in the Danelaw before it appeared in official documents, or that the term does not say much about the poet's origins. Other attempts to date the poem are often based on its wording, with some preferring a later date based on a perceived criticism of Æthelred, and others preferring an earlier date, not detecting any criticism. By the 1990s, Cyril Roy Hart observed significant debate and a wide range of opinions on the poem:

What strikes me most is the wide variety of opinions that have been expressed [...] Except when one is obviously copying the opinions of another, no two commentators on the poem, however renowned, end up with precisely the same interpretation. If anything, controversy as to the date and place of composition, the purpose of the poem, its sources and its evidential value, is greater today than ever before.

Since the 1990s, historians have supported an earlier date, with Martin Ryan writing that the poem was "perhaps though not certainly written soon after [the battle]". Hart suggests that the poem was known to Ramsey Abbey before 1006. Donald Scragg, who believes in an early date for the poem, notes that it uses the spelling Byrhtnoth, which seems to have been in use in the late tenth century. Meanwhile, the spelling Brihtnoth would become common by the eleventh century. Scragg observes that the English armour is described in terms accurate to before 1008, and the list of names is extensive and accurate as far as is known. According to Levi Roach, "common sense would seem to indicate an early date: it was in the aftermath of the battle that the need would have been greatest to memorialize those who had laid down their lives".

Commentators have been traditionally trusting of the poem, with E.V. Gordon writing that "the account of the poem, so far as its statements can be checked, is accurate in every particular." Since the late twentieth century, there has been more caution, and Blake even argued that the poem should be assumed to be inaccurate. Roach remarked that the poet, rather than telling a factual account, "is spinning a good yarn". Ann Williams believes that the historicity of the poem is "open to discussion". To Scragg, the accuracy of the poem varies, and "at every turn this witness to the event has to be seen as a work of art and not as a factual account".

== Family ==
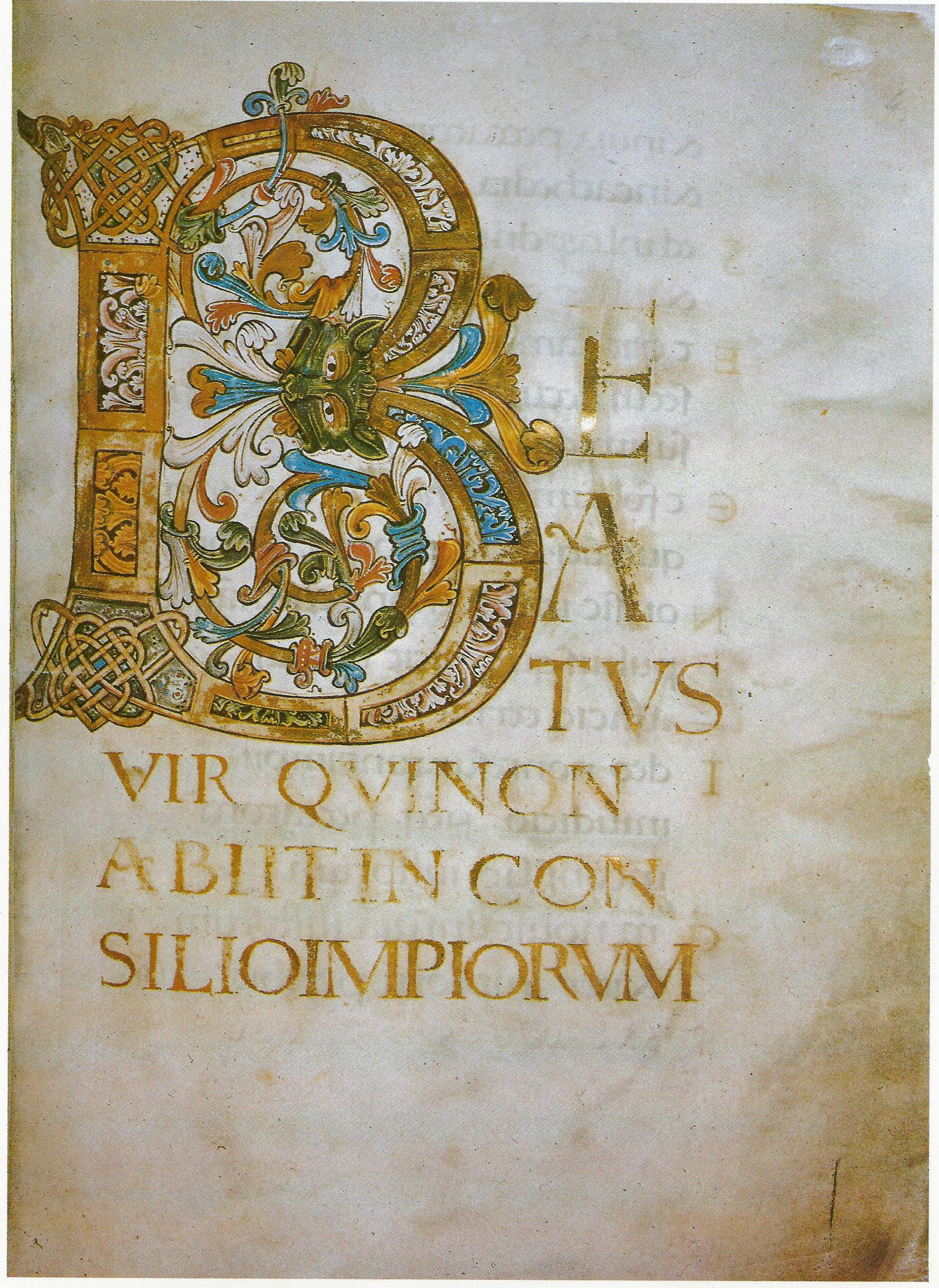
Illumination from the Ramsey Psalter, either made for use at Ramsey Abbey or for Ramsey's founder, Oswald of Worcester.

Byrhtnoth's family origins are unclear, but he was of noble birth, and his father is named as Byrhthelm by the poet of The Battle of Maldon. He had a brother named Brihtric and a sister, whose son Wulfmaer fought alongside Byrhtnoth in 991. Byrhtnoth likely had Mercian origins; a large part of his patrimony was in Cambridgeshire, and he was related to a descendant of the Mercian ealdorman Ealhhelm. Byrhtnoth's earliest landed involvements were exclusively Mercian. The name part "Byrht-" was mainly common among Mercian nobility and æthelings in the ninth century, and it has been suggested that he was descended from the Mercian royal family. Byrhtferth was Byrhtnoth's direct predecessor as ealdorman of Essex, and as the Anglo-Saxons often used the same name element between generations, historians Hart and Scragg believe that he was likely Byrhtnoth's uncle as well. Richard Abels is somewhat cautious, commenting that the evidence is only circumstantial.

Byrhtferth attested to the charters of Eadred as Ealdorman of Essex beginning in 955 and continued to attest to the charters of Eadwig until 13 February 956, after which point he disappears. (Note: Charters, or diplomas, are highly formulaic documents which record grants of lands or privileges. The witness lists show the composition of the king's household.) Byrhtnoth was married before 951 to Ælfflaed, the daughter of Ælfgar, ealdorman of Essex, but may have been married earlier, with a separate daughter named Leofflaed who seems to have been of high status. The marriage had taken place over 40 years before Byrhtnoth's death in battle. According to Scragg, accounting for a prior wife, Byrhtnoth must have been around twenty when he married Ælfflaed. Another of Ælfgar's daughters was married to Edmund I. With Ælfflaed, Byrhtnoth had no surviving children.

== Ealdorman ==
=== Rise under Eadwig and Edgar ===
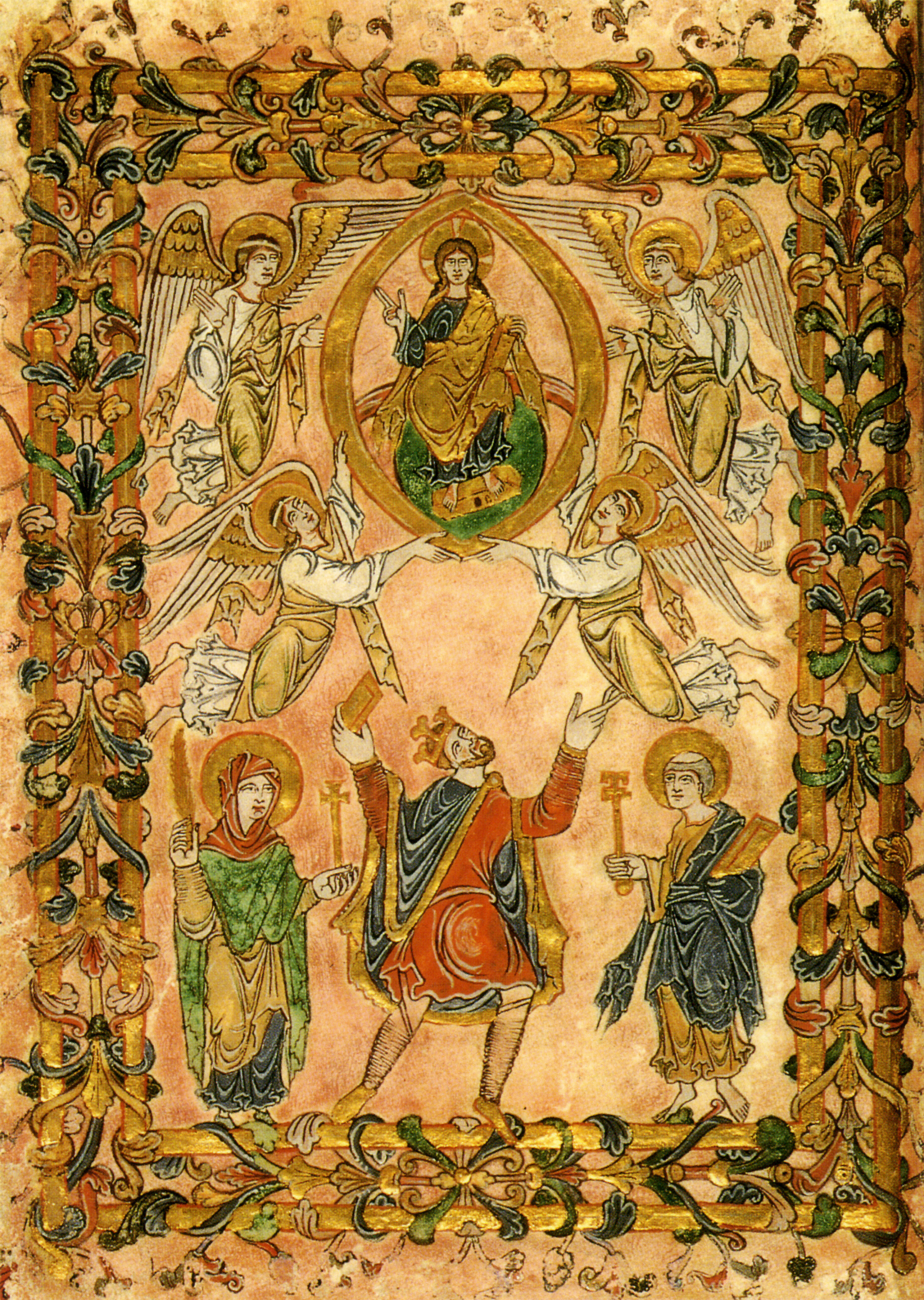
Byrhtnoth was a witness to the illuminated New Minster Charter of 966 as Ego Beorhtnoð dux, appearing last among the ealdormen.

Byrhtnoth enjoyed the patronage of King Eadwig, and convinced the king to grant land to the church at Worcester. While still a thegn in early 956, Byrhtnoth seems to have succeeded Byrhtferth as ealdorman of Essex late in the year. Byrhtnoth is witness to three charters in 956, and on all of them he appears last among the ealdormen. The historian Shashi Jayakumar perceives a promotion of Byrhtnoth's "kin group" under Eadwig, with Byrhthelm, Eadwig's appointee to the see of Winchester, and Æthelweard the Chronicler being possible kin. Byrhtnoth was related to most of the great men in southern England, including figures such as Ælfhere of Mercia. (Note: By the 10th century, the role of an ealdorman had become well defined as local rulers acting on the king's behalf who led local armies, presided over the shire and other courts, collected taxes for the king, and took a share of the profits from the ealdormanry.) The jurisdiction of the ealdormen of Essex extended beyond Essex itself, including Huntingdonshire, and the Liber Eliensis, a history of Ely Abbey, calls Byrhtnoth the earl of Northumbria. Hart believes that his jurisdiction extended over the whole Five Boroughs.

There was apparent conflict over Eadwig's marriage at court, with the young king attempting to marry Ælfgifu despite their apparent blood relation, and it became the most significant issue at court. During the conflict, Byrhtnoth was part of the king's party as his appointee, but the marriage did not ultimately last against the opposition from Eadgifu, the dowager queen, and Abbot Dunstan. The ASC C reports that "in this year [957] the atheling Edgar succeeded to the kingdom of the Mercians." A partition of the kingdom took place in that year, with Eadwig's younger brother Edgar becoming king of all the territory north of the Thames, although Eadwig retained the title king of the English. Byrhtnoth's ealdormanry was left in Edgar's territory. Simon Keynes notes that Byrhtnoth was one of the "new" men transferred to Edgar's court after the division of 957. During the partition, which lasted for two years, Byrhtnoth was a broadly consistent witness to Edgar's charters, while disappearing from those of Eadwig. Eadwig died on 1 October 959, and Edgar acceded to the whole kingdom. Byrhtnoth remained a consistent witness to the king's charters and slowly acquired land, much of it in Mercia.

There is evidence of over 40 estates held by Byrhtnoth over ten shires, many of which were concentrated in Cambridgeshire, Huntingdonshire, and Northamptonshire, but also elsewhere in Mercia, East Anglia, and Essex. One estate of his in Suffolk, Hadleigh, had been the resting place of Guthrum. (Note: Practically all the evidence for Byrhtnoth's holdings is found in royal diplomas and the grants of his wife Ælfflaed, particularly her bequests in her will. Ælfflaed's will provides knowledge of his estates in Cambridgeshire, Sussex, and Essex. She does not appear to have received these lands from her own family.) Byrhtnoth's extensive estates made him one of the richest men in the kingdom. He routinely attested third or fourth among the ealdormen by the end of Edgar's reign, and was among three other leading ealdormen in importance: Æthelwine of East Anglia, Ælfhere of Mercia, and Oslac of York. Edgar was able to control them, but the power of the ealdormen was becoming unwieldy and would increase after his death.

=== Under Edward the Martyr ===
Edgar died in 975 at the age of thirty-two and left behind two sons. The eldest, Edward, was about sixteen years old and born to Æthelflæd Eneda. The younger son, Æthelred, was born to the queen Ælfthryth and was around eight or nine. Edward was known for his outbursts of rage, which may have helped motivate a party of nobles led by Ælfthryth. Eadmer later claimed that Edward's opponents challenged the status of his mother; she, though lawfully married, had never been crowned queen in contrast to Ælfthryth. Ælthryth and Ælfhere of Mercia supported Æthelred's claim; and Dunstan (now Archbishop of Canterbury), Æthelwine, and Byrhtnoth supported Edward's claim. The sides were likely decided by family alliances rather than the different claims of the æthelings, who were also too young to have taken part.

The dispute did not last, with Edward being accepted before the end of the year. As a compromise, Æthelred received "the lands belonging to kings' sons", some of which were forcefully withdrawn from Abingdon Abbey. The manuscripts of the Chronicle all mention several attacks on monasteries led by Ælfhere around this time. According to the ASC C, "many of the wise servant of God were dispersed," while the ASC E and D explicitly named Ælfhere, with D adding that it was "because of his youth". Byrhtferth of Ramsey praised Byrhtnoth and Æthelwine for their supposed defence of the monasteries. Historians have dubbed this period the "anti-monastic reaction," but the unrest probably was not in opposition to monasticism itself. The monasteries acquired lands aggressively and often forcefully. As a result a large-scale reclamation of land took place after Edgar's death. Sean Miller argues that Æthelwine was remembered at Ely for stealing their estates. Jayakumar notes that "he apparently acted against the interests of the abbey in several land disputes," but notes other instances in the Liber Eliensis where Æthelwine acts in the interests of the abbey. Byrhtnoth's support for monasticism is accepted by Abels and Roach.

Hart believes that Edward's authority north of the Thames was weak; the few royal charters were only concerned with land in Wessex, and Winchester's monopoly on coin dies was broken. Roach believes that this evidence "need not be a sign of weakness". Byrhtnoth continued to attest to the king's charters, although in the 978 witenagemot at Calne, the counsellors fell from the upper story, causing some to be severely injured or even killed. Edward's reign remains poorly recorded. Frank Stenton remarked that there is only "a vague impression of disorder" for the period.

=== Under Æthelred the Unready ===
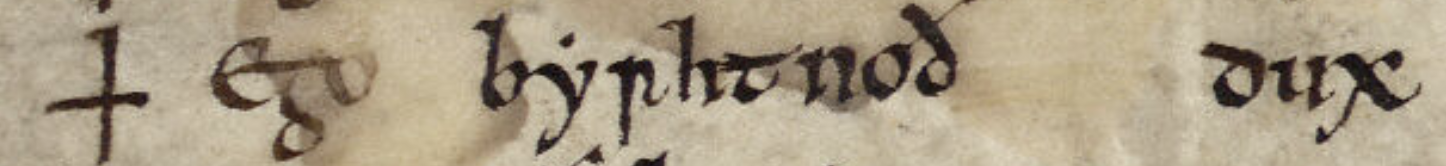
Byrhtnoth attests second among the ealdormen as +Ego Byrhtnoð Dux in a charter of Æthelred the Unready from 987.

Edward was murdered on 11 March 978 while visiting Æthelred and Ælfthryth at Corfe, and though some historians suspect Ælfthryth, her complicity is unproven. (Note: The murder has been interpreted differently by historians. Some find her potential role suspicious, with Hart stating that "it is impossible to exculpate her from all knowledge of the crime," and Pauline Stafford agreeing that she is "difficult to exonerate" from blame. Others are less willing to blame her, with the first source to implicate her over a century later, and no contemporary blamed Ælfthryth. Roach remarks that "it would seem that contemporaries were as uncertain as modern historians as to who was to blame.") Nobody was arrested for the crime. It was over a year later when Æthelred was crowned, on 4 May 979, and Williams believes that there was "relief at a crisis passed." Characterisations of Æthelred vary widely, but many historians emphasise that his government was functional in the early part of his reign. Æthelred was largely surrounded by the nobles who had achieved prominence under Edgar, with Byrhtnoth and Æthelwine being the two most senior and experienced ealdormen, and the lengthy power struggle with Ælfhere ended upon his death in 983.

Roach observes a concentration of authority around a new in-group in Æthelred's court that Byrhtnoth and Æthelwine were excluded from, with Æthelred launching several attacks on monasteries, including ones that Byrhtnoth held ties with. However, Hart believes that they were able to work on restoring monasteries that had been damaged, and suggests that the two were able to maintain stability until they died in 991 and 992, respectively: "until then, the Vikings could only mount raids that penetrated short distances and for short periods". Scragg argues that with Æthelwine's serious illness in 991, Byrhtnoth was "in the position of the principal ealdorman of the realm." Abels considers him the most influential layman in England after the king by that point.

England was free from attack from the 950s until 980, which commenced a period sometimes known as the "Second Viking Age". Raids took place from 980 to 982, and in 988, but they were probably seen as little more than local problems. The men of a shire were organised into single fighting units during this period, such as in 988 when the thegns of Devon beat back an attack. (Note: Byrhtferth of Ramsey records that Byrhtnoth fought a battle with the raiders shortly afterwards, and most historians accept he was referring to the battle of Maldon despite the dating, with Michael Lapidge remarking that Byrhtferth "is more interested in the typological symmetry between east and west than with mere chronology." The historian Eric John believed that the Latin passage made more sense if Byrhtferth was referring to a separate battle in 988, in addition the battle of Maldon, but this is fringe. Scragg remarks that the claim of two battles at Maldon is "both unlikely and without confirmation elsewhere.") The historian Eric John suggested that English successes in 988 could have helped enable the advantageous treaty with Richard II of Normandy in 990, which resulted in an alliance between Richard and Æthelred.

== Battle of Maldon ==
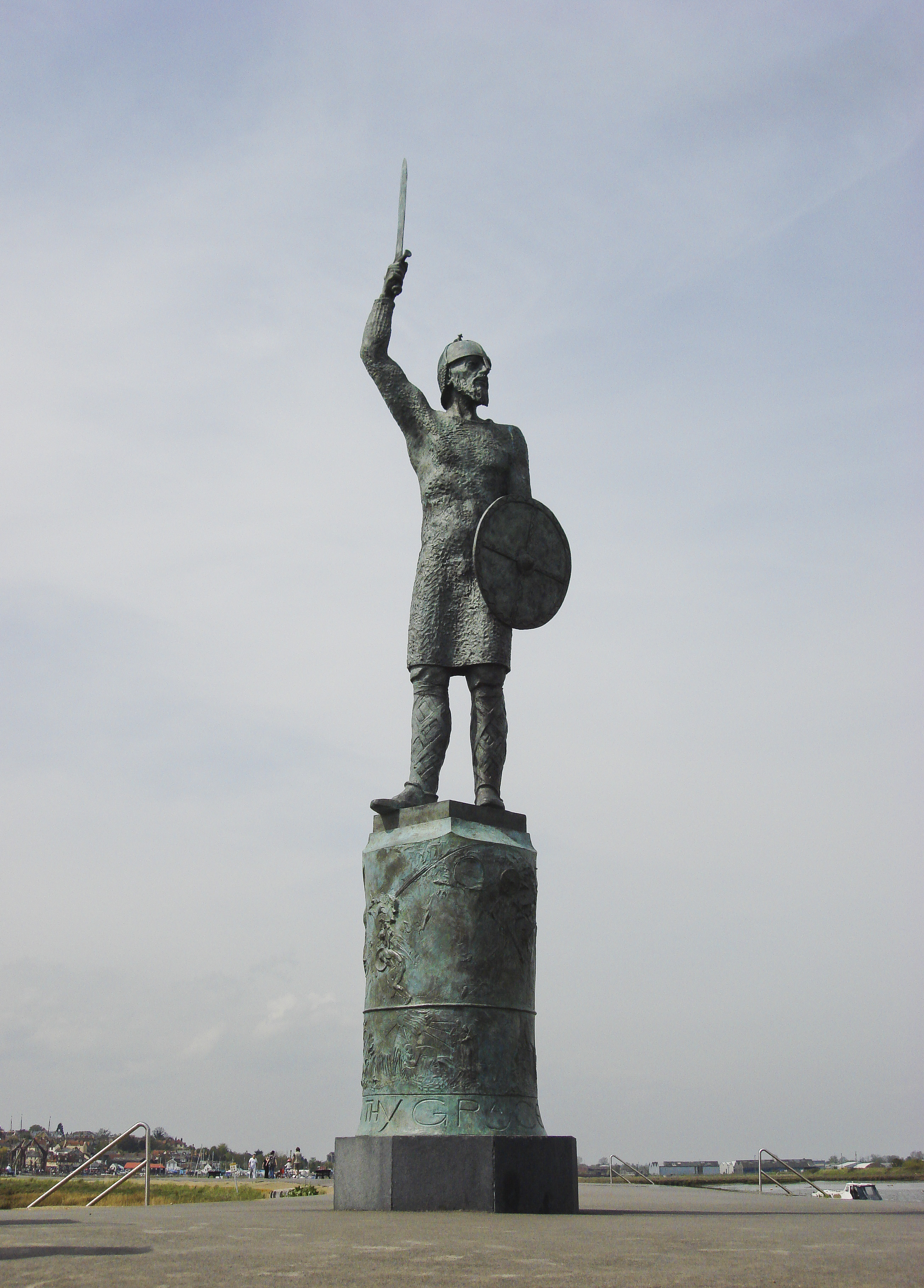
Statue of Byrhtnoth in Maldon, Essex created by John Doubleday

In 991 a force under Olaf Tryggvason landed in England, and the ASC A writes that "Olaf came with 93 ships to Folkestone, and ravaged round about it, and then from there went to Sandwich, and so from there to Ipswich, and overran it all, and so to Maldon." John reads Olaf's campaign as a "desperate comeback". Normandy had been used as a base for Viking attacks on England, and Richard's peace treaty heightened the stakes for the Vikings. The Anglo-Saxon Chronicle does not provide any tactical detail on the battle of Maldon, nor does Byrhtferth of Ramsey. The most immediate and detailed source on the battle is the fragment of the vernacular poem, The Battle of Maldon.

Æthelwine, who was ill, does not seem to have done anything to oppose the attack at Ipswich, and the Vikings then sailed to the mouth of the river Blackwater. It is generally accepted that Olaf's men encamped on Northey Island, although Hart believes that it would leave them vulnerable to blockade, instead arguing that the Vikings advanced on Maldon overland. The records of Ely and Ramsey, claiming that Byrhtnoth visited them on the way to the battle, record similar stories about how Ely won over Byrhtnoth by providing hospitality and provisions to them. These stories are questionable, with Keynes remarking that much about them is "erroneous, or delightfully contrived," although Abels suggests they could contain a kernel of truth. Scragg believes that Byrhtnoth would have felt responsible for Ipswich's defence, but he could not have raised troops in time. While Olaf's men were preoccupied in the sack, Byrhtnoth would have spent this time assembling troops.

By 11 August 991 Byrhtnoth's army consisted of two groups, a trained force of professionals from his household and a larger body of lesser-trained fyrdmen. Based on the East Saxon hidage, Hart believes that the first group may have numbered around 300 men, and the second group a maximum of 700, but this still left Byrhtnoth outnumbered by more than three to one. To Hart, "the English levies, poorly equipped and hastily assembled, could hardly have matched up to their opponents." The composition of the fyrd is debated, (Note: Arguments vary from a general military obligation to all freemen, to a selective group of more professional fighters, to including a subsection of wealthier commoners. Charles Warren Hollister suggested that the fyrd may have been divided into a smaller "select" fyrd, and a larger and cruder "great" fyrd, a solution which became popular. Among its critics was Nicholas Hooper, who noted that much of Hollister's evidence was post-conquest.) but armour seems to have been rarer among English troops before 1008 than after, although this is based on Heriots from the period, which are likely incomplete.

According to the poem, Byrhtnoth arrayed his men on the bank of the Blackwater, thus occupying the causeway between Northey and the mainland. The Vikings send a messenger to demand tribute, and this fliting or "scolding dispute" was common in heroic poetry; as a result, Scragg considers the parley part of this tradition. Byrhtnoth responds that he and his men wish to offer "spears as tribute" and sends three men to defend the causeway, but he may have instead sent up an elite group. The poem then continues:

When they realized this and saw clearly
that they had come up against fierce guardians of the causeway there
then the hateful visitors started to use guile (lytegian):
they requested that they be allowed to have passage
to cross over the ford, to advance their troops.
Then, because of his pride (ofermod), the leader [Byrhtnoth] began
to allow the hateful people too much land.

The poet probably criticises with the use of the term ofermod, which has been translated as simply "overconfidence," "pride," or, more critically, "overmastering pride". However, these translations suggest different levels of censure. Stenton remarks that "with what even those who admired him called over-courage, Byrhtnoth agreed to this." Byrhtnoth's decision has been heavily criticised by literary scholars–most notably J.R.R. Tolkien–who consider it the cause of his defeat. Ofermod has also been translated more positively as "great boldness" or "great bravery", while scholars more sympathetic to Byrhtnoth have pointed out that the Vikings could simply sail away if boxed in and plunder elsewhere, and that the ealdorman intended to destroy them. (Note: Scragg believes that the Vikings actually overwhelmed any attempt to defend the causeway, with the deployment on the causeway meant only to inflict casualties.) Byrhtnoth was killed in the fighting, and a number of his men fled, receiving censure from the poet. Many of Byrhtnoth's thegns chose to continue fighting and die for their lord, but the battle was lost.

== Legacy ==
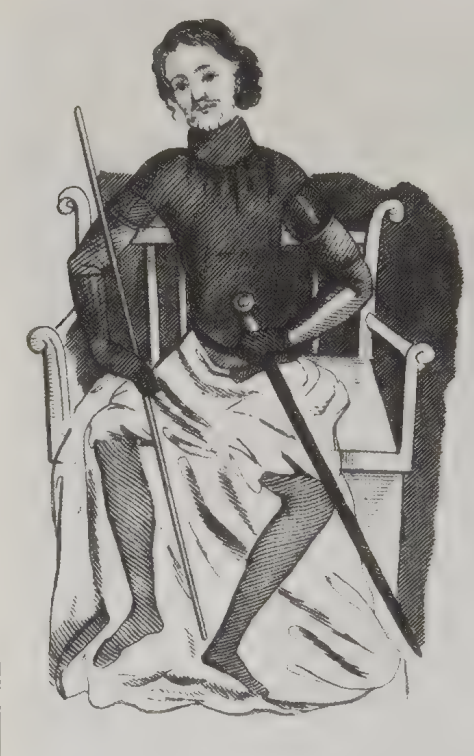
Drawing of a late medieval painting of Byrhtnoth above his tomb in the north wall of the Norman quire of Ely Cathedral

Byrhtnoth gave land to several religious houses in England, including Ramsey, Abingdon, and Mersea, and was a significant patron of Ely Abbey. The ealdorman granted a significant number of estates to the Abbey in 991, in addition to a possible grant to Christ Church, Canterbury in the same year. (Note: Dorothy Whitelock believed that the charter to Christ Church was most likely spurious, but could contain genuine information.) Historian Charles Reginald Dodwell remarks that "Byrhtnoth was clearly one of the great heroes of East Anglia." He was noted by later chroniclers at the abbeys of Ely and Ramsey, as well as by Byrhtferth, who were strongly favourable towards the ealdorman. In his hagiography of the saint Oswald of Worcester, Byrhtferth singled out Byrhtnoth for praise, calling him "a religious man [who was] fearing God". All of the accounts mention his courage in battle, his "swan-white" hair, and his massive size. His decision to let the Vikings pass was criticised, but it had its own allure, and the Liber Eliensis describes him as "unremitting in his battles against the enemies of the country". The monks of Ely removed Byrhtnoth's headless body from the battlefield and buried it, and it was reportedly then that the newly-widowed Ælfflaed gave the Abbey a tapestry or hanging celebrating his deeds, presumably in the style of the Bayeux Tapestry, the only surviving example of such a work. This was given immediately after his death, so it had probably been hanging in his home previously.

Byrhtferth also claims that the Vikings suffered heavy casualties at Maldon and were "scarcely able to man their ships," a claim which has been taken seriously by the historian Martin Ryan, although the ASC C, D, and E report that the Danes continued to cause a "great terror" along the coast. Byrhtnoth was one of the most senior ealdormen in the kingdom, and his death was a shocking blow, which resulted in the first tribute (gafol) payment to the Vikings in generations: a sum of 10,000 pounds. After Maldon, there were more active, though unsuccessful, attempts to combat the Viking threat, with a ship levy in 992 and a large army assembled in 993 to face an attack against Lindsey and Northumbria.

After his burial, his remains, along with those of six other Saxon 'benefactors of Ely Church' (also known as the seven 'Confessors of Christ'), have been moved and reburied three times. Byrhtnoth and the others (Note: These included Wulfstan of York, Osmund of Sweden, Athelstan of Elmham, Ælfwine of Elmham, Ælfgar of Elmham, and Eadnoth of Dorchester.) were all exhumed from their burial places in the old Saxon abbey church, and in the mid-1150s the remains were reinterred in the 'Northern Part' of the new Norman church, which by then had been made Ely Cathedral. Following the collapse of the central tower in 1322, a new octagonal space was created, and a wall was built on its north side to separate the monastic area of the choir from the pilgrim entrance and route to the shrine of Æthelthryth (St Etheldreda). Within this wall the seven benefactors were buried, with wall paintings of each in an elaborate arcade facing the pilgrim entrance, perhaps to remind visitors of the enduring respect that can accrue from such generosity.

The shrines were destroyed, and pilgrimages ceased at the Reformation, but in 1769, when the choir stalls were moved out of the Octagon, the wall was demolished and James Bentham found that the remains of the seven benefactors were still there, each in a separate compartment, although Byrhtnoth's was headless. All the clerics were estimated to be over 6 feet (1.8 m) tall, and Byrhtnoth's bones suggested that he stood at 6 feet 9 inches (2.06 m), although the modern estimate of Byrhtnoth's height is at a little over six feet. On 31 July 1781 they were again re-interred, with considerable ceremony, at the far east end of the cathedral, in niches constructed within the gothic splendour of Bishop Nicholas West's Chantry chapel.

In October 2006, a statue created by John Doubleday was placed at the end of the Maldon Promenade Walk, facing the battle site of Northey Island and the Causeway. The battle site itself has a National Trust plaque recording his 'heroic defeat and death'. As well as the Anglo-Saxon poem, The Battle of Maldon, J.R.R. Tolkien's short alliterative play, The Homecoming of Beorhtnoth, Beorhthelm's Son takes place on the battlefield of Maldon and deals with the search for Byrhtnoth's body.

== Sources ==
- Abels, Richard (1988). Lordship and Military Obligation in Anglo-Saxon England. Berkeley, California: University of California Press. ISBN 978-0-520-05794-4.
- Abels, Richard (2001). "From Alfred to Harold II: The Military Failure of the Late Anglo- Saxon State". In Abels, Richard; Bachrach, Bernard (eds.). The Normans and their Adversaries at War. The Boydell Press. pp. 15–30. ISBN 9780851158471. Archived from the original on 12 April 2026.
- Abels, Richard (2004). "Byrhtnoth [Brihtnoth] (d. 991)". Oxford Dictionary of National Biography (online ed.). Oxford University Press. doi:10.1093/ref:odnb/3429. (Subscription, Wikipedia Library access or UK public library membership required.)
- Atherton, Mark (2021). The Battle of Maldon: War and Peace in Tenth-Century England. London, UK: Bloomsbury Academic. ISBN 9781350167506.
- Blake, N. F. (1978). "The genesis of "The Battle of Maldon"". Anglo-Saxon England. 7: 119–129. ISSN 0263-6751.
- Campbell, A., ed. (1973). Charters of Rochester. London: Oxford University Press. ISBN 978-0-19-725936-8.
- "Charter S 617". The Electronic Sawyer: Online Catalogue of Anglo-Saxon Charters. London: King's College London.
- "Charter S 745". The Electronic Sawyer: Online Catalogue of Anglo-Saxon Charters. London: King's College London.
- "Charter S 1494". The Electronic Sawyer: Online Catalogue of Anglo-Saxon Charters. London: King's College London.
- "Charter S 1637". The Electronic Sawyer: Online Catalogue of Anglo-Saxon Charters. London: King's College London.
- "Charter S 1639". The Electronic Sawyer: Online Catalogue of Anglo-Saxon Charters. London: King's College London.
- Clark, George (1968). "The Battle of Maldon: A Heroic Poem". Speculum. 43 (1): 52–71. doi:10.2307/2854798. ISSN 0038-7134.
- Clark, Cecily (1983). "On Dating The Battle of Maldon: Certain Evidence Reviewed". Nottingham Medieval Studies. 27 (1): 1–22. doi:10.1484/j.nms.3.107. ISSN 0078-2122.
- Hart, Cyril (1957). The Early Charters of Essex. Leicester: Leicester University Press.
- Hart, Cyril (1992). The Danelaw. London, UK: The Hambledon Press. ISBN 978-1-85285-044-9.
- Hart, Cyril (2007) [2004]. "Edward [St Edward; called Edward the Martyr]". Oxford Dictionary of National Biography (online ed.). Oxford University Press. doi:10.1093/ref:odnb/8515. (Subscription, Wikipedia Library access or UK public library membership required.)
- Dodwell, Charles (1982). Anglo-Saxon Art: A New Perspective. Manchester, UK: Manchester University Press. ISBN 978-0-7190-0861-0.
- Forte, Angelo; Oram, Richard; Pedersen, Frederik (2005). Viking Empires. Cambridge, UK: Cambridge University Press. ISBN 978-0-521-82992-2.
- Gordon, Eric Valentine (1937). The Battle of Maldon. London: Methuen.
- Hollister, Charles Warren (1962). Anglo-Saxon Military Institutions on the Eve of the Norman Conquest. Clarendon Press.
- Hooper, N.J. (1978). "Anglo-Saxon Warfare on the Eve of the Conquest". The Proceedings of the Battle Conference on Anglo-Norman Studies, I. Brill: 84–93. ISSN 0261-9857.
- Huscroft, Richard (2019). Making England, 796- 1042. Routledge. ISBN 978-1-138-18246-2.
- John, Eric (1966). Orbis Britanniae. Leicester, UK: Leicester University Press. OCLC 398831.
- John, Eric (1977). "War and Society in The Tenth Century: the Maldon Campaign". Transactions of the Royal Historical Society. 27. Royal Historical Society: 173–195. doi:10.2307/3679193.
- Keynes, Simon (1980). The Diplomas of King Æthelred the Unready 978-1016. Cambridge, UK: Cambridge University Press. ISBN 978-0-521-02308-5.
- Keynes, Simon (1999). "England, c. 900–1016". In Reuter, Timothy (ed.). The New Cambridge Medieval History. Vol. III. Cambridge, UK: Cambridge University Press. pp. 456–484. ISBN 978-0-521-36447-8.
- Keynes, Simon (2002). An Atlas of Attestations in Anglo-Saxon Charters, c.670–1066. Cambridge, UK: Dept. of Anglo-Saxon, Norse, and Celtic, University of Cambridge, UK. ISBN 978-0-9532697-6-1.
- Keynes, Simon (2003). "Ely Abbey, 672–1109". In Meadows, Peter; Ramsay, Nigel (eds.). A History of Ely Cathedral. Woodbridge: The Boydell Press. pp. 3–58. ISBN 0-85115-945-1.
- Keynes, Simon (2004). "Eadwig [Edwy] (c. 940–959)". Oxford Dictionary of National Biography (online ed.). Oxford University Press. doi:10.1093/ref:odnb/8572. (Subscription, Wikipedia Library access or UK public library membership required.)
- Keynes, Simon (2008). "Edgar rex admirabilis". In Scragg, Donald (ed.). Edgar King of the English: New Interpretations. Woodbridge, UK: The Boydell Press. pp. 3–58. ISBN 978-1-84383-399-4.
- Keynes, Simon (2014a). "Charters and Writs". In Lapidge, Michael; Blair, John; Keynes, Simon; Scragg, Donald (eds.). The Wiley Blackwell Encyclopedia of Anglo-Saxon England (2nd ed.). Chichester, West Sussex: Wiley Blackwell. pp. 102–103. ISBN 978-0-470-65632-7.
- Kirby, I. J. (1992). "In Defence of Byrhtnoth". Florilegium. 11 (1): 53–60. doi:10.3138/flor.11.005. ISSN 0709-5201.
- Lindley, Phillip (1995). "The Imagery of the Octagon at Ely". Gothic to Renaissance: Essays on Sculpture in England. Stamford: Paul Watson. p. 142. ISBN 1871615763.
- Lapidge, Michael, ed. (2009). Byrhtferth of Ramsey: The Lives of St Oswald and St Ecgwine (in Latin and English). Oxford: Clarendon Press. ISBN 978-0-19-955078-4.
- McKinnell, John (1975). "On the Date of "the Battle of Maldon"". Medium Ævum. 44 (1/2): 121–136. doi:10.2307/43628102. ISSN 0025-8385.
- Miller, Sean (2014a). "Edward the Martyr". In Lapidge, Michael; Blair, John; Keynes, Simon; Scragg, Donald (eds.). The Wiley Blackwell Encyclopedia of Anglo-Saxon England (2nd ed.). Chichester, West Sussex: Wiley Blackwell. pp. 167–168. ISBN 978-0-470-65632-7.
- Miller, Sean (2014b). "Æthelred the Unready". In Lapidge, Michael; Blair, John; Keynes, Simon; Scragg, Donald (eds.). The Wiley Blackwell Encyclopedia of Anglo-Saxon England (2nd ed.). Chichester, West Sussex: Wiley Blackwell. pp. 16–17. ISBN 978-0-470-65632-7.
- Pons-Sanz, Sara M. (2008). "Norse-derived Terms and Structures in The Battle of Maldon". The Journal of English and Germanic Philology. 107 (4): 421–444. ISSN 0363-6941.
- Roach, Levi (2016). Æthelred the Unready. New Haven, Connecticut: Yale University Press. ISBN 978-0-300-19629-0.
- Ryan, Martin (2013). "The Age of Æthelred". In Higham, Nicholas; Ryan, Martin (eds.). The Anglo-Saxon World. New Haven, Connecticut: Yale University Press. pp. 335–373. ISBN 978-0-300-12534-4.
- Scragg, Donald (2006). The Return of the Vikings: The Battle of Maldon 991. Tempus Publishing. ISBN 978-0-7524-2833-8..
- Jayakumar, Shashi (2008). "Eadwig and Edgar: Politics, Propaganda, Faction". In Scragg, Donald (ed.). Edgar King of the English: New Interpretations. Woodbridge, Suffolk: The Boydell Press. pp. 83–103. ISBN 978-1-84383-399-4.
- Jayakumar, Shashi (2009). "Reform and Retribution: the Anti-Monastic Reaction in the Reign of Edward the Martyr". In Baxter, Stephen; Karkov, Catherine; Nelson, Janet; Pelteret, David (eds.). Early Medieval Studies in Memory of Patrick Wormald. London: Routledge. pp. 337–352. ISBN 978-1-138-24819-9.
- Stafford, Pauline (2004a). "Ælfgifu". Oxford Dictionary of National Biography (online ed.). Oxford University Press. doi:10.1093/ref:odnb/179. (Subscription, Wikipedia Library access or UK public library membership required.)
- Stafford, Pauline (2004b). "Ælfthryth (d. 999x1001)". Oxford Dictionary of National Biography (online ed.). Oxford University Press. doi:10.1093/ref:odnb/194. (Subscription, Wikipedia Library access or UK public library membership required.)
- Stafford, Pauline (2014). "Ealdorman". In Lapidge, Michael; Blair, John; Keynes, Simon; Scragg, Donald (eds.). The Wiley Blackwell Encyclopedia of Anglo-Saxon England (2nd ed.). Chichester, West Sussex: Wiley Blackwell. pp. 156–157. ISBN 978-0-470-65632-7.
- Stenton, Frank (1971). Anglo-Saxon England (3rd ed.). Oxford, UK: Oxford University Press. ISBN 978-0-19-821716-9.
- Swanton, Michael, ed. (2000). The Anglo-Saxon Chronicles (revised paperback ed.). London, UK: Phoenix. ISBN 978-1-84212-003-3.
- Turner, D.H. (1984). "Part II: The Golden Age". In Backhouse, Janet; Turner, D.H.; Webster, Leslie E. (eds.). The Golden Age of Anglo-Saxon Art, 966-1066. London: British Museum: Indiana University Press.
- Weikert, Katherine (2024). "Eadwig Has a Threesome: Sex and the Breaking of Authority in the Tenth Century". In Blanchard, Mary; Riedel, Christopher (eds.). The Reigns of Edmund, Eadred and Eadwig, 939-959: New Interpretations. Woodbridge, UK: The Boydell Press. pp. 175–195. ISBN 978-1-78327-764-3.
- Whitelock, Dorothy (1930). Anglo-Saxon Wills. Cambridge, UK: Cambridge University Press. OCLC 786120891.
- Whitelock, Dorothy (1955). English Historical Documents v.l. c.500–1042 (1 ed.). London: Eyre & Spottiswoode.
- Whitelock, Dorothy; Douglas, David; Tucker, Susie, eds. (1961). The Anglo-Saxon Chronicle. London, UK: Eyre and Spottiswoode. OCLC 317315404.
- Williams, Ann; Smyth, Alfred P.; Kirby, D. P. (1991). "Introduction". In Williams, Ann; Smyth, Alfred P.; Kirby, D. P. (eds.). A Biographical Dictionary of Dark Age Britain. London, UK: Seaby. ISBN 978-1-85264-047-7.
- Williams, Ann (1999). Kingship and Government in Pre-Conquest England. Bloomsbury Publishing. ISBN 9781349274543.
- Williams, Ann (2003). Æthelred the Unready: The Ill-Counselled King. London, UK: Hambledon and London. ISBN 978-1-85285-382-2.
- Williams, Ann (2004a). "Edmund I". Oxford Dictionary of National Biography (online ed.). Oxford University Press. doi:10.1093/ref:odnb/8501. (Subscription, Wikipedia Library access or UK public library membership required.)
- Williams, Ann (2004b). "Edgar [called Edgar Pacificus]". Oxford Dictionary of National Biography (online ed.). Oxford University Press. doi:10.1093/ref:odnb/8463. (Subscription, Wikipedia Library access or UK public library membership required.)
- Yorke, Barbara (1995). Wessex in the Early Middle Ages. London, UK: Leicester University Press. ISBN 0-7185-1856-X.
