= Ælfgifu (wife of Eadwig) =

Queen of England from 955 to 958

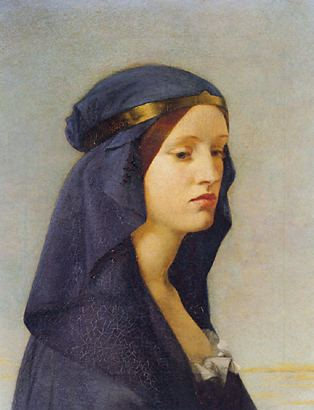

Queen consort of the English
- Tenure: c. 955 – 958
- Burial: Winchester Cathedral
- Spouse: Eadwig, King of the English (annulled)
- Father: Uncertain
- Mother: Æthelgifu

Ælfgifu was Queen of the English as wife of King Eadwig of England (r. 955–959) for a brief period of time until 957 or 958.

What little is known of Ælfgifu comes primarily by way of Anglo-Saxon charters, possibly including a will, the Anglo-Saxon Chronicle and hostile anecdotes in works of hagiography. Her union with the king, annulled within a few years of Eadwig's reign, seems to have been a target for factional rivalries which surrounded the throne in the late 950s. By c. 1000, when the careers of the Benedictine reformers Dunstan and Oswald became the subject of hagiography, its memory had suffered heavy degradation. In the mid-960s, however, she appears to have become a well-to-do landowner on good terms with King Edgar and, through her will, a generous benefactress of ecclesiastical houses associated with the royal family, notably the Old Minster and New Minster at Winchester.

== Family background ==
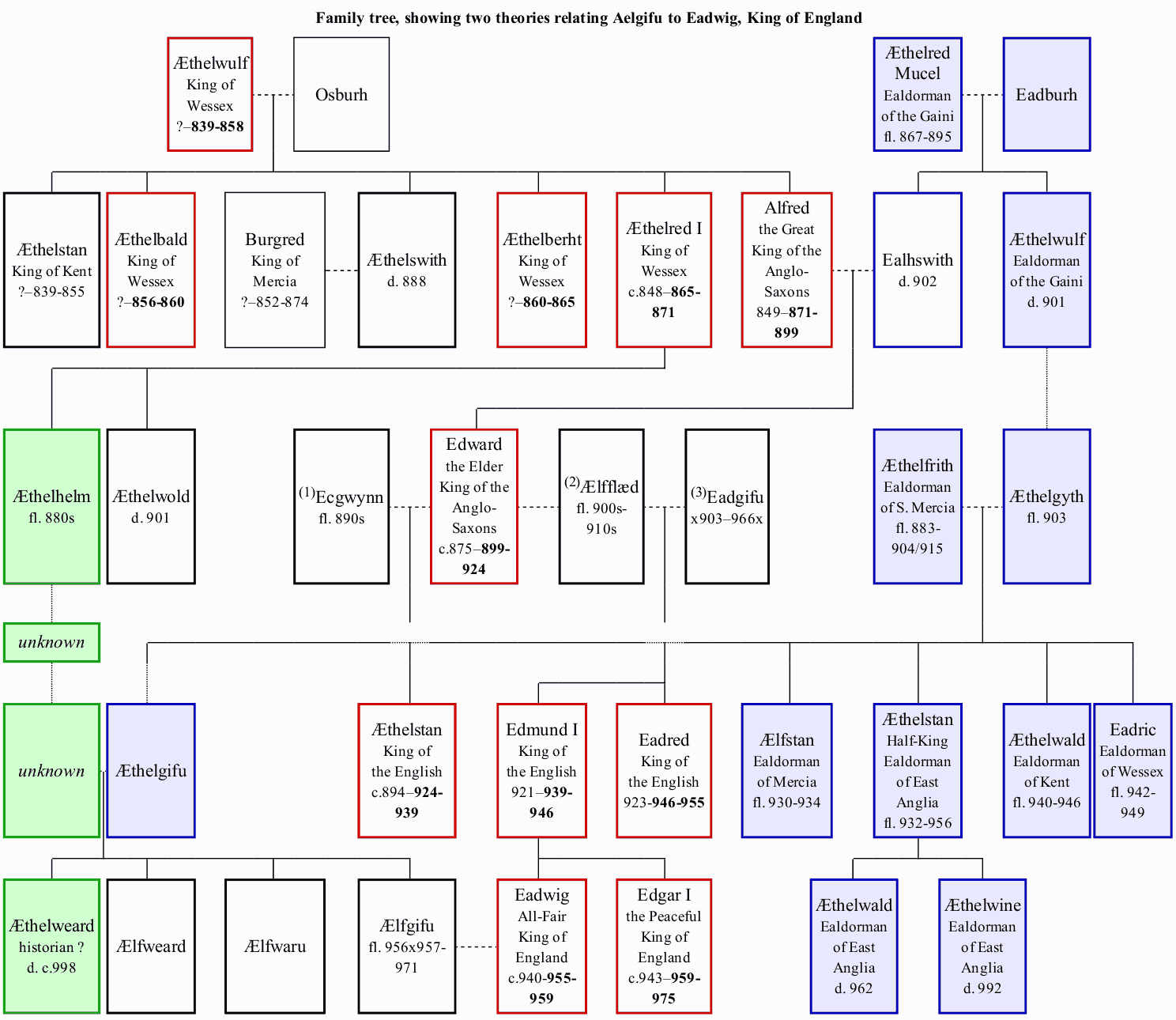
Two genealogical hypotheses (green and blue) for the connection between Ælfgifu and Eadwig, combined in a diagram

Two facts about Ælfgifu's family background are unambiguously stated by the sources. First, her mother bore the name of Æthelgifu, a woman of very high birth (natione præcelsa). Second, she was related to her husband Eadwig, since in 958 their marriage was dissolved by Archbishop Oda on grounds that they were too closely related by blood, that is, within the forbidden degrees of consanguinity. Ælfgifu has been also identified with the namesake who left a will sometime between 966 and 975, which might shed further light on her origins.

These dangling clues, unsatisfying as they are in themselves, have been used to construct two possible—and possibly compatible—genealogies for Ælfgifu, both of which ascribe to her a degree of royal rank. One theory espoused by Cyril Hart and considered by Pauline Stafford makes her a noblewoman of Mercian stock, who descended from Ealdorman Æthelfrith of Mercia and his wife Æthelgyth, who may have been a daughter of ealdorman Æthelwulf and a niece of King Alfred's Mercian consort Ealhswith. This reconstruction is based on the probability that Risborough (Buckinghamshire), one of Ælfgifu's holdings mentioned in the will, was previously held by Æthelgyth. The possible implication is that Ælfgifu inherited the estate and many others in Buckinghamshire. Given that she asked Bishop Æthelwold, one of her beneficiaries, to intercede for her "mother's soul", she may have done so through the maternal line. If the suggestion is correct, she would have been closely related to the politically prominent family of ealdorman Æthelstan Half-King and his offspring.

Her supposed will also provides the starting point for another, more widely regarded hypothesis. In this document, she makes bequests to Ælfweard and Æthelweard, seemingly her brothers (one of whom was married to Æthelflæd), and to her sister Ælfwaru. Æthelweard and Ælfweard re-appear as brothers and thegns (ministri) in the witness list of a spurious royal charter dated 974. This appears to be the same Æthelweard who regularly attests royal charters between 958 and 977 as the king's thegn and may have moved on to become the illustrious ealdorman of the Western Provinces and author of a Latin chronicle, in which he claimed descent from King Æthelred of Wessex (d. 871), fourth son of King Æthelwulf. The conclusion which can be derived from these prosopographical byways is that if the ealdorman and chronicler Æthelweard was her brother, she must have shared with him a common ancestor in King Æthelred. In this light, Ælfgifu would have been Eadwig's third cousin once removed.

The two genealogies are not mutually exclusive. Andrew Wareham suggests that these two different branches of the royal family may have come together in the marriage which produced Ælfgifu. In view of the will's special mention of Ælfgifu's "mother's soul", this could mean that Æthelgifu was a descendant of Æthelgyth, while the anonymous father traced his descent to Æthelred.

Neither hypothesis is conclusive. A weakness shared by these suggestions is that they hinge on the assumption that the testatrix Ælfgifu is the same as the erstwhile royal consort. However, for reasons explored below, the identification is favoured by most historians, though usually with reservations.

== Marriage ==
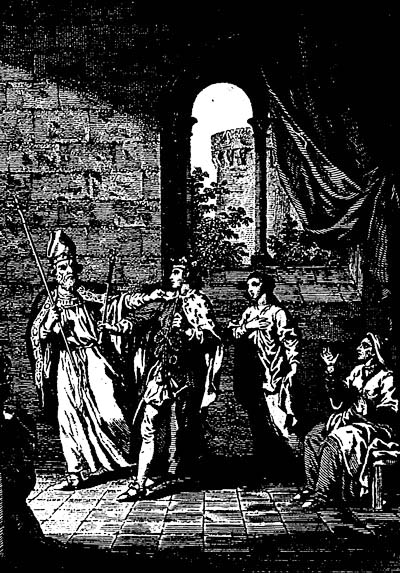
Late 18th-century engraving by Samuel Wale. Impression of Dunstan's encounter with Eadwig and the two women in the royal chamber

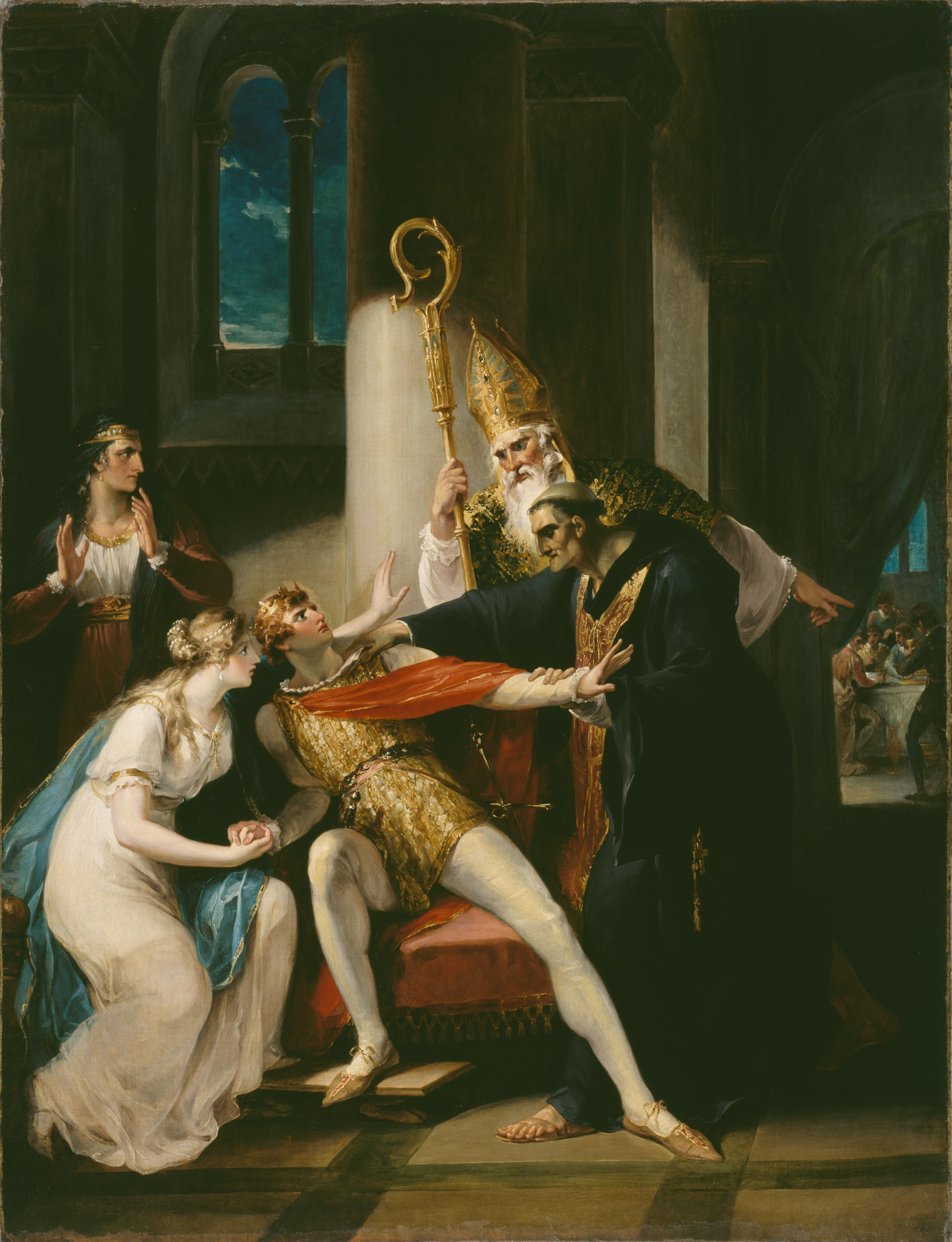
Painting by William Hamilton of the scene, with both Dunstan and Oda dragging Eadwig from Ælfgifu's chamber

At an unknown date around the time of his accession, the young King Eadwig married Ælfgifu. The union was or was to become one of the most controversial royal marriages in 10th-century England. Eadwig's brother Edgar was the heir presumptive, but a legitimate son born out of this marriage would have seriously diminished Edgar's chances of succeeding to the kingship, especially if both parents were of royal rank. Fostered by Ælfwynn, wife of Æthelstan Half-King together with her son Æthelwine, Edgar enjoyed the support of Æthelstan Half-King (d. after 957) and his sons, whose power base was concentrated in Mercia and East Anglia and who would not have liked to lose power and influence to Ælfgifu's kinsmen and associates. If Hart's suggestion that Ælfgifu was of royal Mercian descent and related to the latter family is correct, it might have been hoped that the marriage would give Eadwig some political advantage in exercising West-Saxon control over Mercia.

Ælfgifu's mother, Æthelgifu, seems to have played a decisive role in her rise to prominence by the king's side, as indicated by their joint appearances in the sources. Together they witness a charter which records an exchange of land between Bishop Brihthelm and Æthelwold, then abbot of Abingdon. and both their names occur among “illustrious” benefactors on a leaf of the early 11th-century Liber Vitae of the New Minster, Winchester. In her presumed will (see above), Ælfgifu asks Bishop Æthelwold, one of her beneficiaries, to intercede for her and her mother.

It is probable that they are the two women who are portrayed as Eadwig's sexual partners in the Life of St Dunstan by author 'B' and that of St. Oswald by Byrhtferth of Ramsey, both dating from around 1000. Dunstan's Life alleges that on the banquet following the solemnity of his coronation at Kingston (Surrey), Eadwig left the table and retreated to his chamber to debauch himself with two women, an indecent noblewoman (quaedam, licet natione præcelsa, inepta tamen mulier), later identified as Æthelgifu, and her daughter of ripe age (adulta filia). They are said to have attached themselves to him "obviously in order to join and ally herself or else her daughter to him in lawful marriage.". Shocked by Eadwig's unseemly withdrawal, the nobles sent Dunstan and Bishop Cynesige, who forcefully dragged the king back to the feast. For this act, Dunstan had incurred the enmity of the king, who sent him into exile at Æthelgifu's instigation. Called a modern Jezebel, she would have exploited Eadwig's anger by ordering Dunstan's persecution and the spoliation of his property. That the memory of Eadwig's sexual affairs had become tainted and confused around the turn of the century is suggested by Byrhferth's Life of St. Oswald, which has a more fantastic tale to tell about Eadwig's two women. It recounts that the king was married, but ran off with a lady who was below his wife's rank. Archbishop Oda personally seized the king's new mistress at her home, forced her out of the country and managed to correct the king's behaviour.

These stories, written down some 40-odd years later, seem to be rooted in later smear campaigns which were meant to bring disrepute on Eadwig and his marital relations. Although both Lives focus on the personal dimension of the affairs from the perspective of their protagonists, the effects of factional rivalries loom in the background. It is known that in 958 Archbishop Oda of Canterbury, a supporter of Dunstan, annulled the marriage of Eadwig and Ælfgifu on the basis of their consanguinity. The underlying motive for this otherwise surprisingly belated decision may well have been political rather than religious or legal, as it bolstered Edgar's status as heir to the throne. There is a good possibility that Oda's act had been spurred on by Edgar's sympathisers, the sons of Æthelstan Half-King, and in particular by their ally Dunstan, whose monastic reform they generously supported.

The event needs to be placed in the broader context of Eadwig's struggle to retain political control and of the factions which supported Edgar as the heir presumptive. In the summer of 957, Edgar was elected king of Mercia. Author 'B' presents this as the outcome of a northern revolt against Eadwig, whereby he lost control north of the Thames (Mercia and Northumbria) and Edgar was set up as king over that part of England. This is a gross exaggeration, since Eadwig retained the title "king of the English" in his charters and Æthelweard envisaged a "continuous" reign. Edgar's description as regulus in an alliterative charter of 956 may even signify that there was a prior agreement that Edgar would become his brother's subking in Mercia as soon as he reached majority. The weakness of Eadwig's political position is nevertheless confirmed by Bishop Æthelwold's retrospective note of complaint that Eadwig "had through the ignorance of childhood dispersed his kingdom and divided its unity".

While it appears then that Dunstan and Archbishop Oda opposed the marriage, it was not all hostility that Ælfgifu had to endure from ecclesiastical magnates. Another Benedictine reformer, Æthelwold, abbot of Abingdon and later bishop of Winchester, seems to have preferred to support her, even if he was not uncritical of her husband's reign. One of the few charters to have been witnessed by Ælfgifu is the aforementioned memorandum from Abingdon, which confirms an exchange of land between Æthelwold and Brihthelm. In the subscription, she is recognised as the king's wife (þæs cininges wif). Ælfgifu's will, if it can be ascribed to her, provides even clearer evidence for her close association with Æthelwold.

== Dowagerhood ==
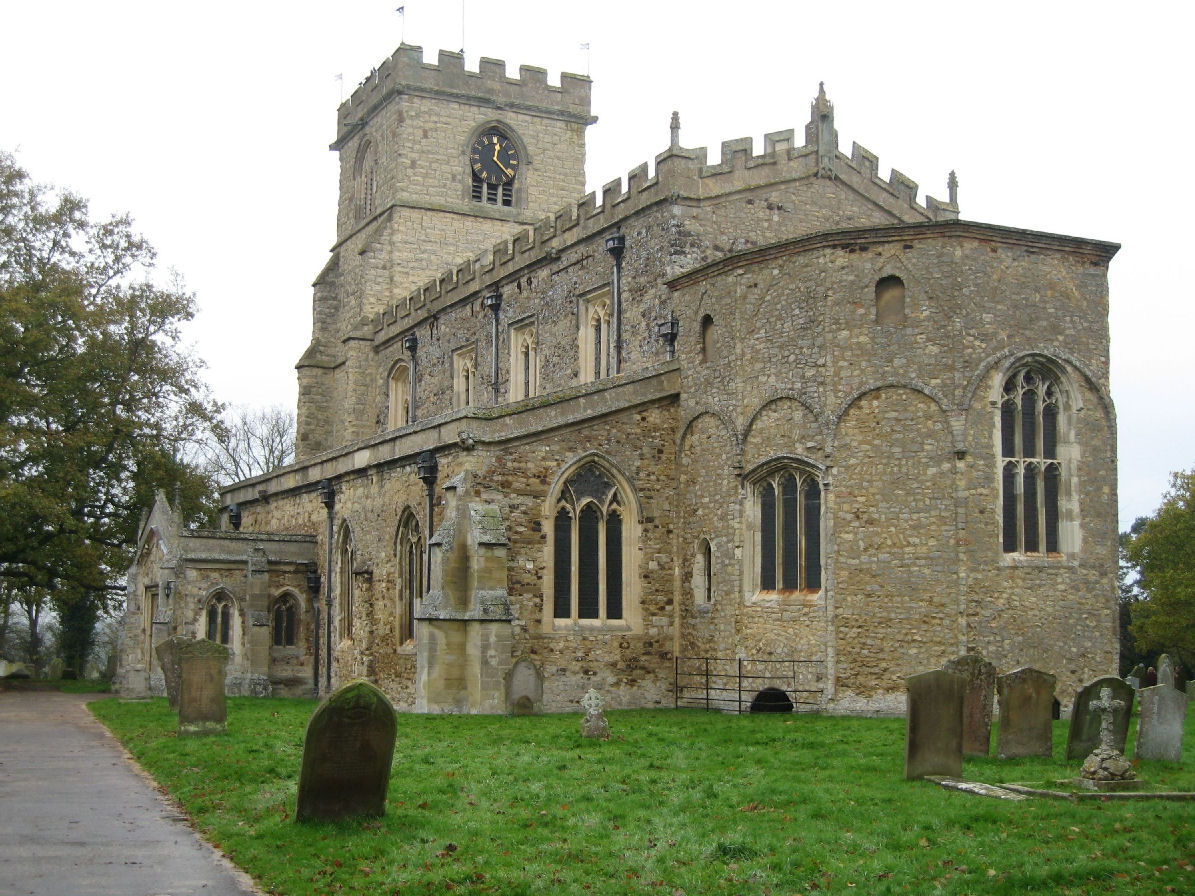
The present-day Church of All Saints at Wing, Buckinghamshire. The church may be of 9th-century origin and would have formed part of Ælfgifu's manor. The polygonal apse at the east end and the crypt below the sanctuary are later modifications and may possibly be associated with Ælfgifu.

No less important than the circumstances of her married life is the way Ælfgifu may have pushed on since the break-up of her marriage and more especially since the autumn of 959, when Eadwig died (1 October 959) and was succeeded by his brother Edgar as king of all England. The vitae are unhelpful at this point. Byrhtferth writes that Eadwig's mistress was exiled by Oda (d. 958), but his account of the archbishop's intervention is dubious and only faintly echoes the historical information of the Chronicle. Less credible still is the tale recorded by Osbern in the late 11th century. Adopting B's depiction of Edgar's Mercian reign as the outcome of a very coup against Eadwig, he amplifies the story by suggesting that Eadwig's mistress (adultera) was hamstrung in an ambush by Mercian resurgents and died not long thereafter.

Whether Ælfgifu kept a low profile or truly lived in exile, as Byrhtferth appears to claim, there is evidence to suggest that by the mid-960s, she had come to enjoy some peace, prosperity and a good understanding with King Edgar and the royal house. This picture is based on her identification with the Ælfgifu who was a wealthy landowner in Southeast England and a relative of King Edgar. She appears under Edgar's patronage in two royal charters of AD 966, in which he calls her "a certain noble matron (matrona) who is connected to me by the relationship of worldly blood". Sometime before Edgar's death (975), she left a will in which she bequeathed extensive estates in Buckinghamshire, Oxfordshire and Hertfordshire, considerable sums of money and various objects of value to (1) ecclesiastical houses (Old and New Minster, Abingdon Abbey, Romsey Abbey and Bath Abbey), (2) Bishop Æthelwold (in person), (3) members of the royal family (Edgar, Queen Ælfthryth and Edward the Martyr), and (4) her closest relatives (her two brothers, her sister and her brother's wife). The most substantial bequests are those to King Edgar and the Old Minster, which received the vast estate at Princes Risborough amounting to 30 hides. No children are mentioned. Exceptionally high status is suggested by a gift or payment to Edgar which has been interpreted as her heriot, consisting of two armlets of 120 mancuses each, a drinking-cup, 6 horses, 6 shields and 6 spears. There is no conclusive proof, but that the two Ælfgifus are identical is strongly suggested by their intimate association with the royal family, Bishop Æthelwold, the New Minster at Winchester and with their own mother.

Sadly, the conditions of Ælfgifu's return to fortune remain unclear. It would have been important to know, for instance, how and on what terms she came to hold the estates mentioned in her will. Those at Newnham Murren and Linslade were previously granted to her by King Edgar and now returned to the royal family, but it is impossible to determine which of the other estates were part of her dower property and which were inherited or acquired otherwise. As noted earlier, a case has been made for Princes Risborough as having been passed on through the maternal line. If the other holdings were likewise her own, the rehabilitation of her position may have come at a great price, one which considerably enriched the royal family with land north of the Thames.

Although in the two charters of 966, Edgar showed generosity and recognised the bonds of kinship, it has been asked how much of it was driven by pressure rather than good will. In favour of the former, Andrew Wareham has suggested that in naming his third and most 'throneworthy' son (b. after c. 964) Æthelred, after his great-great-uncle and thus after Ælfgifu's and Æthelweard's ancestor (see genealogy ↑), Edgar may have intended to make a sympathetic gesture by which he stressed their kinship.

In her will, Ælfgifu associates her endowments of "God's church" with the salvation of both her and Edgar's soul, which suggests that she expressed a shared interest in the Benedictine reform, of which Edgar was a generous sponsor and Bishop Æthelwold a prominent conductor. In turn, she may have hoped that he would put her grants to good and pious use. According to the Libellus Æthelwoldi, such seems to have come true in the case of Marsworth, which he donated to Ely Abbey, refounded by Bishop Æthelwold in 970.

An intriguing aspect of Ælfgifu's will is the way in which it may have been used to tie her kin-group and associates more closely in a beneficial relationship with the royal family and the leading ecclesiastical establishments, or else to reaffirm the association. This is seen at its most straightforward when she addresses Edgar with a special request: "I beseech my royal lord for the love of God, that he will not desert my men who seek his protection and are worthy of him." She also made sure that Mongewell, near Edward's new estate at Newnham Murren, and Berkhampstead did not pass directly to the community of the Old Minster, but was first leased by her siblings on the condition that they rendered a food rent (feorm) to the two minsters every year.

While Eadwig, like Alfred and Edward, was buried in the New Minster, Ælfgifu intended her body to be buried in the nearby Old Minster. At Winchester, Ælfgifu was remembered for her generosity, as was the woman who may have been her mother: Ælfgyfu coniunx Eadwigi regis and Æþelgyfu, who may be her mother, appear on a page of the New Minster Liber Vitae of 1031 among the illustrious benefactresses of the community.

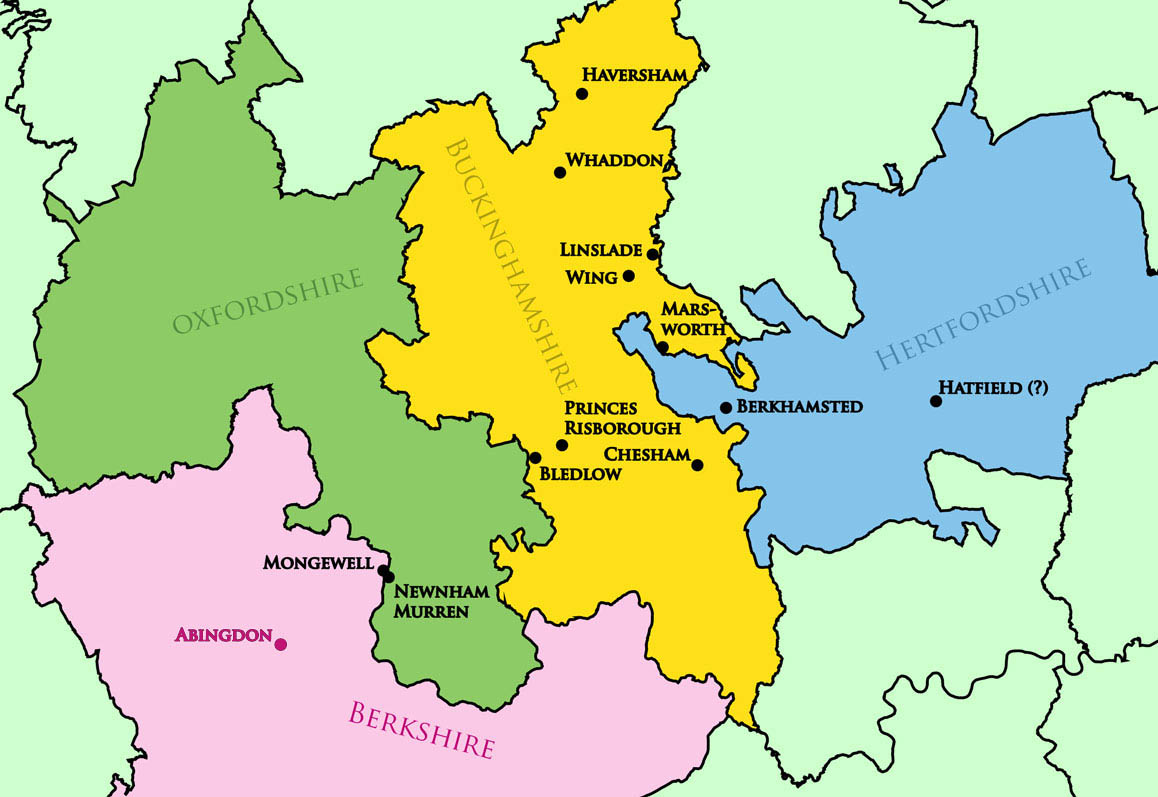
Locations of Ælfgifu's estates and Abingdon, shown within the modern counties Oxfordshire, Buckinghamshire, Berkshire and Hertfordshire. The estate south of Winchester, Gussage (Gysic) in Dorset, is not shown here.

BENEFICIARY	BEQUEST
Ecclesiastical houses:
Old Minster, Winchester	estate at Princes Risborough (Bucks.), except manumitted slaves
	+ 200 mancuses of gold, her shrine with relics
	+ Estates at Mongewell (Oxon.) and Berkhampstead (Herts.), see below.
New Minster, Winchester	estate at Bledlow (Bucks.)
	+ 100 mancuses of gold
Nunnaminster (St Mary's Abbey), Winchester	a paten (offring-disc)
Nunnery of Christ and St Mary at Romsey (Hants.), refounded by Edgar in 967.	estate at Whaddon (Bucks.)
Abingdon Abbey	Chesham (Bucks.)
Bath Abbey	Wickham (Wicham), possibly in Berkshire or further south, Hampshire, but the place-name is too common for identification.
Royal family
King Edgar	estates at Wing (Bucks.), Linslade (Bucks., cf: S 737), Haversham (Bucks.), Hatfield (Herts.?), Masworth or Marsworth (Bucks.) and Gussage (All Saints, Dorset)
	+ 2 armlets (of 120 mancuses each), a drinking-cup (sopcuppan), 6 horses, 6 shields and spears (presumably her heriot "death-duty").
the ætheling, probably Edward	estate at Newnham Murren (Oxon.), previously granted by King Edgar (S 738)
	+ armlet of 30 mancuses
Queen (Ælfthryth)	a necklace of 120 mancuses, armlet of 30 mancuses, and a drinking-cup
Family
Ælfweard, Æthelweard and Ælfwaru	estates at Mongewell (Oxon.) and Berkhampstead (Herts.) for their lifetime, with annual food-rent of two days for the Old and New Minster; with reversion to the Old Minster after their life-time.
Ælfwaru	"all that I have lent her"
Ælfweard	drinking-cup
Æthelweard	ornamented drinking-horn
Æthelflæd, her brother's wife	headband
Bishops and abbots
Bishop Æthelwold	estate at Tæafersceat (unidentified), with a request to intercede for her and her mother.
Each abbot	5 pounds of pence to spend on repairing their minster
Bishop Æthelwold and Æthelgar, abbot of the New Minster.	remaining money entrusted to them for (1) maintenance of the Old Minster and (2) alms-giving.

== Primary sources ==
- Æthelweard, The Chronicle of Aethelweard: Chronicon Aethelweardi, ed. and tr. Alistair Campbell, The Chronicle of Æthelweard. London: Nelson, 1962.
- Anglo-Saxon charters:
  - S 1292, Agreement between Bishop Brihthelm and Æthelwold (AD 956 x 957).
  - S 1484, Ælfgifu's will (AD 966 x 975), from the Old Minster archive, ed. and tr. D. Whitelock, Anglo-Saxon Wills. Cambridge Studies in English Legal History. Cambridge, 1930.
  - S 737, King Edgar grants 10 hides at Linslade (Buckinghamshire) to the matrona Ælfgifu, his kinswoman (AD 966, archive: Abingdon).
  - S 738, King Edgar to 10 hides at Newnham Murren (Oxfordshire) to the matrona Ælfgifu, his kinswoman (AD 966, archive: Old Minster).
  - S 745, New Minster refoundation charter (AD 966).
- Anglo-Saxon Chronicle MS D, ed. David Dumville and Simon Keynes, The Anglo-Saxon Chronicle. a collaborative edition. Vol. 6. Cambridge, 1983
  - The Anglo-Saxon Chronicles; Michael J. Swanton, trans. 2nd ed. London, 2000.
- Author 'B.', Vita S. Dunstani, ed. W. Stubbs, Memorials of St Dunstan, Archbishop of Canterbury. (Rolls Series; 63.) London: Longman & Co., 1874. 3–52.
- Byrhtferth of Ramsey, Life of St Oswald, ed. J. Raine, Historians of the Church of York and its Archbishops. (Rolls Series; 71.) 3 vols: vol 1. London: Longman & Co., 1879: 399–475.
- Liber Eliensis, ed. E. O. Blake, Liber Eliensis. (Camden Third Series; 92.) London: Royal Historical Society, 1962; tr. J. Fairweather. Liber Eliensis. A History of the Isle of Ely from the Seventh Century to the Twelfth. Woodbridge, 2005.
- Keynes, Simon, ed. (1996). The Liber vitae of the New Minster and Hyde Abbey, Winchester : British Library Stowe 944 : together with leaves from British Library Cotton Vespasian A. VIII and British Library Cotton Titus D. XXVII. Copenhagen, Denmark: Rosenkilde and Bagger.

Royal titles
Preceded by Æthelflæd of Damerham	Queen consort of the English; 955–958	Succeeded by Ælfthryth, wife of Edgar
