= Ælfwynn, wife of Æthelstan Half-King =

Anglo-Saxon noblewoman (died 983)

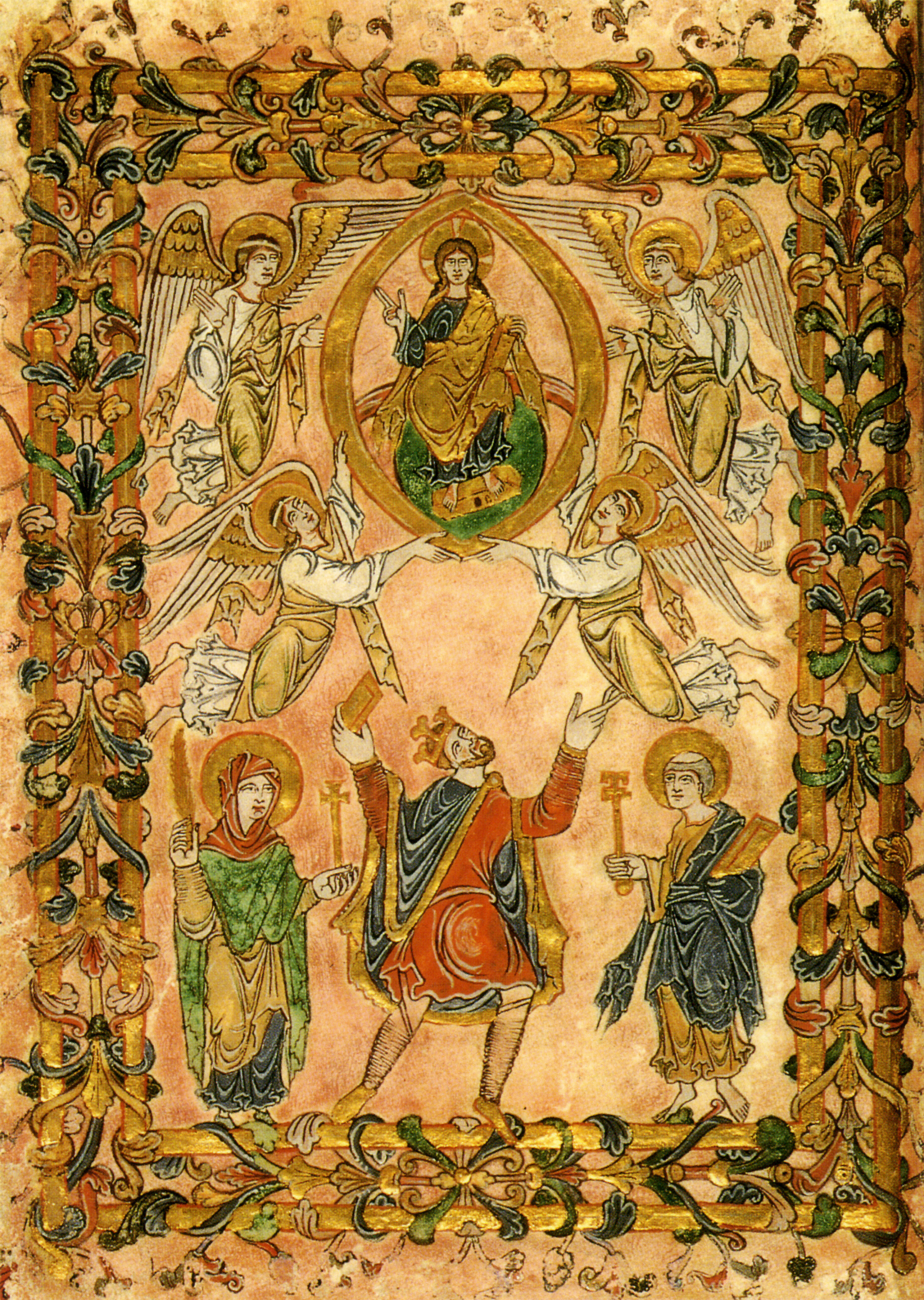
Portrait of Ælfwynn's foster-son King Edgar flanked by the Virgin Mary and St Peter in the Winchester New Minster Charter of 966

Ælfwynn or Ælfwyn (died 8 July 983) was a member of a wealthy Anglo-Saxon family in Huntingdonshire who married Æthelstan Half-King, the powerful ealdorman of East Anglia, in about 932. She is chiefly known for having been foster-mother to the future King Edgar (ruled 959–975) following his mother's death in 944, when he was an infant. She had four sons, and the youngest, Æthelwine, became the chief secular magnate and leading supporter of the monastic reform movement. Ælfwynn donated her estates for his foundation of Ramsey Abbey in 966 and was probably buried there.

== Life and family ==
Ælfwynn was the wife of Æthelstan Half-King, Ealdorman of East Anglia, who was called the Half-King because he was believed to be so powerful that King Edmund I (r. 940–946) and his brother King Eadred (r. 946–955) depended on his advice. He was a strong supporter of the monastic reform movement and a close friend of Dunstan, who was one of its leaders and a future Archbishop of Canterbury and saint. Æthelstan married Ælfwynn soon after he became an ealdorman in 932. Her parents are not known, but she came from a wealthy Huntingdonshire family. (Note: The historian Shashi Jayakumar suggests that she may have been the Ælfwynn who was the daughter of Æthelflæd, Lady of the Mercians and granddaughter of Alfred the Great. This Ælfwynn ruled Mercia for a few months after her mother's death in 918 before being dispossessed by her uncle, King Edward the Elder. She was her parents' only known child, and she was probably born not long after their marriage in or before 887, in which case she would have been in her mid-forties by the time of the marriage between Æthelstan and Ælfwynn in about 932.) The late tenth-century writer Byrhtferth of Ramsay wrote that her son Æthelwine: "had a distinguished lineage on his mother's side. In praising her, Archbishop Dunstan said that she and her kindred were blessed." (Note: The translation is from Michael Lapidge's edition in Latin and English in 2009. He wrote that Æthelwine "was born of royal stock, and had a distinguished lineage on his mother's side". Andrew Wareham in 2005 quotes the 1879 edition in Latin by James Raine, which leaves out the comma, and Wareham takes "royal stock" to refer to Ælfwynn.) (Note: In an article on Æthelstan Half-King, the historian Cyril Hart states that Ælfwynn was described in the Chronicon Abbatiæ Rameseiensis as "inclyta genealogica". This is a citation error as the phrase is not in the Chronicon. It is in the comment by Byrhtferth (quoted above) as inclitam genealogicam (distinguished lineage). In his Oxford Dictionary of National Biography entry on Æthelstan, Hart stated that she "was of undistinguished birth", but does not explain the comment.) She had a brother, Æthelsige, who acted as a surety when estates in Huntingdonshire were sold to Peterborough Abbey.

Ælfwynn had four sons, Æthelwold, Ælfwold, Æthelsige (his uncle's namesake) and Æthelwine. Æthelwold was appointed an ealdorman for part of his father's territory of East Anglia by Edmund's elder son King Eadwig (r. 955–959) in 956, perhaps in preparation for Æthelstan's retirement shortly afterwards to become a monk at Glastonbury Abbey. In the same year, Æthelwold married Ælfthryth, and after his death in 962 she became the wife of King Edgar the Peaceful (r. 959–975) and the mother of King Æthelred the Unready (r. 978–1016). Ælfwold witnessed Edgar's charters as a thegn from 958 to 972. Ælfwynn's third son, Æthelsige, also witnessed charters as a thegn from 958. He was part of Edgar's inner circle, serving as his camerarius (chamberlain) until 963.

King Edmund's younger son, the future King Edgar, was born around 943 and his mother Ælfgifu died in 944. Edgar was sent to be fostered by Ælfwynn, which the Medieval Latin expert Michael Lapidge sees as a "token of her power and influence". It enabled Æthelstan's family to strengthen its ties with the royal family. Edgar was probably brought up in Huntingdonshire, which was the location of Ælfwynn's estates and later of Æthelwine's home. In about 958 Edgar gave Ælfwynn a ten-hide estate at Old Weston in Huntingdonshire as thanks. The historian Robin Fleming comments that the ætheling (prince) was profoundly influenced by his upbringing:

Thus, the ætheling was reared in the household of one of his father's closest allies and raised among the Half-King's own brothers and sons, five of whom at one time or another were ealdormen. Since Half-King was an intimate of the reform circle, in particular with St Dunstan, Edgar came of age in an atmosphere dominated by the ideals of monastic reform. Some of Edgar's affection for monks and his determination to revive Benedictine monasticism must have been acquired in this household of his youth.

Ælfwynn's youngest son, Æthelwine, was a few years older than Edgar and probably brought up with him. Æthelwine was appointed ealdorman of East Anglia when Æthelwold died in 962, and he became the dominant lay figure in government, attesting charters in first place among the ealdormen, following the death of his chief rival, Ælfhere, Ealdorman of Mercia, in 983. After Æthelsige left Edgar's service, he was active in his brother's administration of East Anglia until he died on 13 October 987.

Æthelwine was called Dei Amicus (friend of God) because he was the leading lay patron (after Edgar) of the monastic reform movement, and in 966 he founded Ramsey Abbey, together with Oswald, the Bishop of Worcester and later Archbishop of York. Ælfwynn supported Ramsey in preference to the religious houses favoured by her husband, and her estates, including the property donated by Edgar, formed part of the endowment for Ramsey. She may have played a crucial role in its establishment. Her second son, Ælfwold, was a strong supporter of monastic reform who ordered the killing of a man who illegally claimed property belonging to Peterborough Abbey. He and his wife were also benefactors of Ramsey, and he was buried there following his death on 14 April 990. Æthelwine ceased attesting charters in 990, and he died on 24 April 992 after a long illness. He was also buried at Ramsey.

== Death ==
Ælfwynn died on 8 July 983. Her husband was buried at Glastonbury Abbey, whereas Ælfwynn was probably buried at Ramsey. She was recorded in the Ramsey necrology as "our sister", the donor of Old Weston, and her death was commemorated each year on 8 July, the same day as King Edgar.

== Sources ==
- "Æthelsige 26 (Male) Uncle of Ealdorman Æthelwine 2, fl. 983x985". Prosopography of Anglo-Saxon England. Archived from the original on 2 August 2022.
- Bailey, Maggie (2001). "Ælfwynn, Second Lady of the Mercians". In Higham, N. J.; Hill, D. H. (eds.). Edward the Elder 899–924. Abingdon, Oxfordshire: Routledge. ISBN 978-0-415-21497-1.
- Fleming, Robin (1991). Kings and Lords in Conquest England. Cambridge, UK: Cambridge University Press. ISBN 978-0-521-52694-4.
- Hart, Cyril (1966). The Early Charters of Eastern England. Leicester, UK: Leicester University Press. OCLC 645356664.
- Hart, Cyril (1992). The Danelaw. London, UK: The Hambledon Press. ISBN 978-1-85285-044-9.
- Hart, Cyril (2004). "Æthelstan [Ethelstan, Æthelstan Half-King] (fl. 932–956)". Oxford Dictionary of National Biography. Oxford University Press. doi:10.1093/ref:odnb/8917. ISBN 978-0-19-861412-8. (subscription, Wikipedia Library access or UK public library membership required)
- Hart, Cyril (2005). "Æthelwine [Ethelwine, Æthelwine Dei Amicus] (d. 992)". Oxford Dictionary of National Biography. Oxford University Press. doi:10.1093/ref:odnb/8917. ISBN 978-0-19-861412-8. (subscription, Wikipedia Library access or UK public library membership required)
- Jayakumar, Shashi (2008). "Eadwig and Edgar: Politics, Propaganda, Faction". In Scragg, Donald (ed.). Edgar King of the English: New Interpretations. Woodbridge, Suffolk: The Boydell Press. pp. 83–103. ISBN 978-1-84383-399-4.
- Keynes, Simon (2002). An Atlas of Attestations in Anglo-Saxon Charters, c.670-1066. Cambridge, UK: Dept. of Anglo-Saxon, Norse, and Celtic, University of Cambridge, UK. ISBN 978-0-9532697-6-1. Archived from the original on 29 July 2022.
- Lapidge, Michael, ed. (2009). Byrhtferth of Ramsey: The Lives of St Oswald and St Ecgwine (in Latin and English). Oxford, UK: Clarendon Press. ISBN 978-0-19-955078-4.
- Macray, W. Dunn, ed. (1886). Chronicon Abbatiae Rameseiensis (in Latin). London, UK: Longman & Co. OCLC 928485.
- Raine, James, ed. (1879). The historians of the church of York and its archbishops. Vol. 1. London, UK: Longman & Co. OCLC 187095558.
- Robertson, Agnes, ed. (1956). Anglo-Saxon Charters (2nd ed.). Cambridge, UK: Cambridge University Press. OCLC 504288415.
- Wareham, Andrew (2005). Lords and Communities in Early Medieval East Anglia. Woodbridge, UK: The Boydell Press. ISBN 978-1-84383-155-6.
- Williams, Ann (2014). "Edgar [called Edgar Pacificus] (943/4–975)". Oxford Dictionary of National Biography. Oxford University Press. doi:10.1093/ref:odnb/8463. ISBN 978-0-19-861412-8. (subscription, Wikipedia Library access or UK public library membership required)
