= Ælfwynn (disambiguation) =

Ælfwynn or Ælfwyn may refer to:

- Ælfwynn, the Second Lady of the Mercians
- Ælfwynn, wife of Æthelstan Half-King, wife of a tenth century English magnate
- Ælfwine of Winchester, bishop of Winchester in the eleventh century
