= Æthelstan Half-King =

Ealdorman of East Anglia

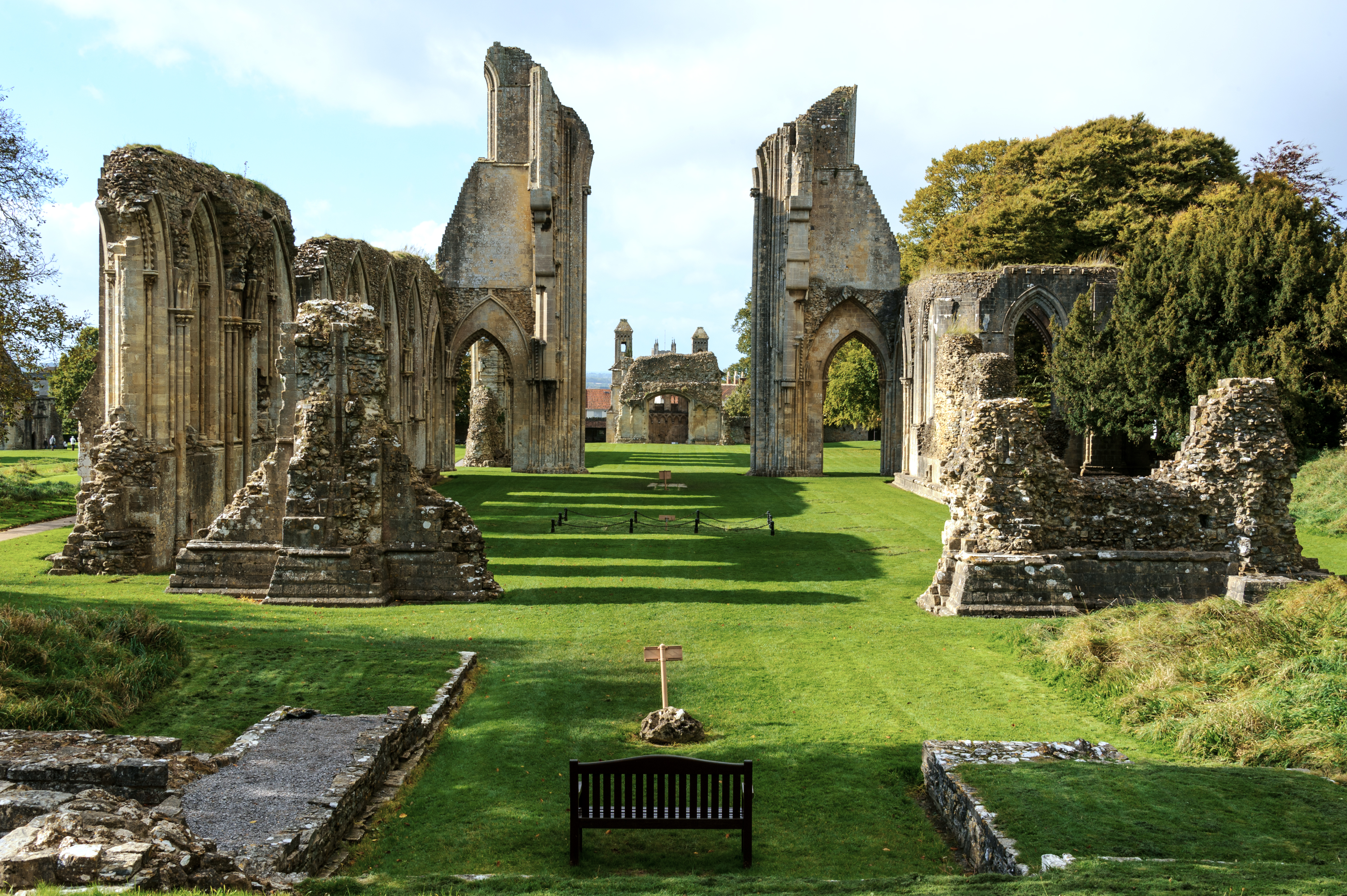
Glastonbury Abbey, rebuilt in the twelfth century

Æthelstan Half-King (fl. 932–956) was an Ealdorman of East Anglia who served five kings of England, including Edgar, who was brought up by Æthelstan's wife Ælfwynn, following the death of Edgar's mother. He was called the "half-king" because he was respected so highly that kings were said to depend on his advice. Many of Æthelstan's close relatives were also involved in important affairs. Soon after the death of King Eadred in 955 he left his position and became a monk at Glastonbury Abbey.

== Origins ==
Æthelstan was the son of Æthelfrith, an Ealdorman who held lands in Somerset, Berkshire, and Middlesex. His mother was Æthelgyth, daughter of Æthelwulf. His elder brother Ælfstan and his younger brothers Æthelwold and Ædric were Ealdormen of south and east Mercia, Kent and central Wessex, respectively. Æthelfrith was an ealdorman in Mercia in the late ninth and early tenth centuries.

== Career ==
Æthelstan seems to have been appointed Ealdorman of East Anglia and other parts by King Æthelstan in about 932. The lands King Æthelstan gave him had mostly been part of the Danelaw which had only been forced out of the area after the Battle of Tempsford in Bedfordshire fifteen years earlier in 917. Æthelstan's brother Ælfstan inherited his father's ealdormandom but died in 934. Æthelwold became an ealdorman in 940 and Eadric in 942.

Æthelstan and his family were supporters of the monastic reforms of Saint Dunstan which introduced the Benedictine rule to Glastonbury. Both Glastonbury, and Abingdon Abbey, were endowed by Æthelstan.

Æthelstan's wife was named Ælfwynn. Her family came from the East Midlands. She was foster-mother of King Edgar of England. Ælfwynn's lands would later endow Ramsey Abbey, refounded by Bishop Æthelwold of Winchester, Bishop Oswald of Worcester, and Æthelstan's son Æthelwine.

The epithet 'Half-King' is first recorded in Byrhtferth of Ramsey's Life of St Oswald, written between 997 and 1002. Byrhtferth referred to "Ealdorman Æthelstan, whom the elders and all the populace called 'Half-King', since he was a man of such authority that he was said to maintain the kingdom and its rule with his advice to the king". Byrhtferth devoted considerable space to Æthelstan's family, several of whom were buried at Ramsey.

The position of Æthelstan and his brothers in the middle of the 10th century has been compared with the similar dominance of the family of Godwin, Earl of Wessex in the 11th century. It is possible that Æthelstan's withdrawal to Glastonbury may not have been voluntary. However, the death of Æthelwald in 962 resulted in the family's offices in Wessex passing to their chief rivals, the family of Ealdorman Ælfhere. The result of this was that the two families were roughly equal in influence. Ælfhere's death in the early 970s did not result in a return of the old dominance of Æthelstan's family.

== Family ==
People associated with Æthelstan's family include Ealdorman Byrhtnoth, whose defeat at the Battle of Maldon is commemorated in verse.

Æthelstan's children included:

- Æthelwald (died c. 962), Ealdorman of Essex, then of East Anglia after his father became a monk. Queen Ælfthryth, daughter of Ealdorman Ordgar, who was later the third wife of King Edgar, was first married to Æthelwald.
- Ælfwald, called dux in charters. He married Elfhild, perhaps the daughter of Ealdorman Elfsige.
- Æthelwig, Ealdorman.
- Æthelsige, became King Edgar's chamberlain (died c. 986).
- Æthelwine (died 992), Ealdorman of East Anglia after Æthelwald, youngest son of Æthelstan. Chief Ealdorman from 983. He married three times, firstly to Æthelflæd who died in 977, secondly to Æthelgifu (d. 985) and thirdly to Wulfgifu (d. 994).

== Sources ==
- Hart, Cyril (2004). "Æthelstan [Ethelstan, Æthelstan Half-King] (fl. 932–956)". Oxford Dictionary of National Biography. Oxford University Press. doi:10.1093/ref:odnb/8917. ISBN 978-0-19-861412-8. (subscription, Wikipedia Library access or UK public library membership required)
- Henson, Donald, A Guide to Late Anglo-Saxon England: From Ælfred to Eadgar II. Anglo-Saxon Books, 1998. ISBN 1-898281-21-1
- Higham, Nick, The Death of Anglo-Saxon England. Sutton, 1997. ISBN 0-7509-2469-1
- Lapidge, Michael, ed. (2009). Byrhtferth of Ramsey: The Lives of St Oswald and St Ecgwine. Oxford, UK: Clarendon Press. ISBN 978-0-19-955078-4.
- Miller, Sean, "Æthelstan Half-King" in Michael Lapidge et al., The Blackwell Encyclopedia of Anglo-Saxon England., 2nd ed. 2014, Wiley Blackwell
- Stenton, Frank, Anglo-Saxon England. Oxford UP, 3rd edition, 1971. ISBN 0-19-280139-2
- William of Malmesbury, The Kings before the Norman Conquest, trans. Joseph Stevenson. Reprinted Llanerch, 1989. ISBN 0-947992-32-4
- Williams, Ann, Smyth, Alfred P., and D.P. Kirkby, A Biographical Dictionary of Dark Age Britain. Seaby, 1991. ISBN 1-85264-047-2
