= Ælfthryth (wife of Edgar) =

Queen of England from 964/965 to 975

Queen consort of the English
- Tenure: 964/965 – 8 July 975
- Coronation: 11 May 973
- Died: 17 November 999, 1000 or 1001
- Spouse: Æthelwald, Ealdorman of East Anglia; Edgar, King of the English
- Issue: Edmund; King Æthelred the Unready
- Father: Ordgar, Ealdorman of Devon

Ælfthryth (also Alfrida, Elfrida or Elfthryth; died 17 November 999, 1000 or 1001) was Queen of the English from her marriage to King Edgar in 964 or 965 until Edgar's death in 975. She was a leading figure in the regency during the minority of her son King Æthelred the Unready between 978 and 984.

Ælfthryth was the first wife of an English king known to have been crowned and anointed as queen since the mid-ninth century. She had two sons with Edgar, Edmund ætheling (who died young) and Æthelred. Ælfthryth was a powerful political figure and post-Conquest historians accused her of orchestrating the murder of her stepson, King Edward the Martyr, in order to place her son Æthelred on the throne. She appeared as a stereotypical bad queen and evil stepmother in many medieval histories.

== Early life ==
Ælfthryth was the daughter of Ordgar, Ealdorman of Devon. Her mother was a member of the royal family of Wessex. The family's power lay in the west of Wessex. Ordgar was buried in Exeter and his son Ordwulf founded, or refounded, Tavistock Abbey.

Ælfthryth was first married to Æthelwald, son of Æthelstan Half-King as recorded by Byrhtferth of Ramsey in his Life of Saint Oswald of Worcester. Later accounts, such as that preserved by William of Malmesbury and Geoffrey Gaimar, add vivid detail of unknown reliability.

According to William and Geoffrey, the beauty of Ordgar's daughter Ælfthryth was reported to King Edgar. Edgar, looking for a Queen, sent Æthelwald to see Ælfthryth, ordering him "to offer her marriage [to Edgar] if her beauty were really equal to report." When she turned out to be just as beautiful as was said, Æthelwald married her himself and reported back to Edgar that she was quite unsuitable. Edgar was eventually told of this, and decided to repay Æthelwald's betrayal in like manner. He said that he would visit the poor woman, which alarmed Æthelwald. He asked Ælfthryth to make herself as unattractive as possible for the king's visit, but she did the opposite. According to William, Edgar, quite besotted with her, killed Æthelwald during a hunt. Geoffrey instead states that Edgar posted Æthelwald to Northumbria where he was attacked and killed by outlaws.

The historical record does not record the year of Æthelwald's death, let alone its manner. No children of Æthelwald and Ælfthryth are known.

== Queen consort ==
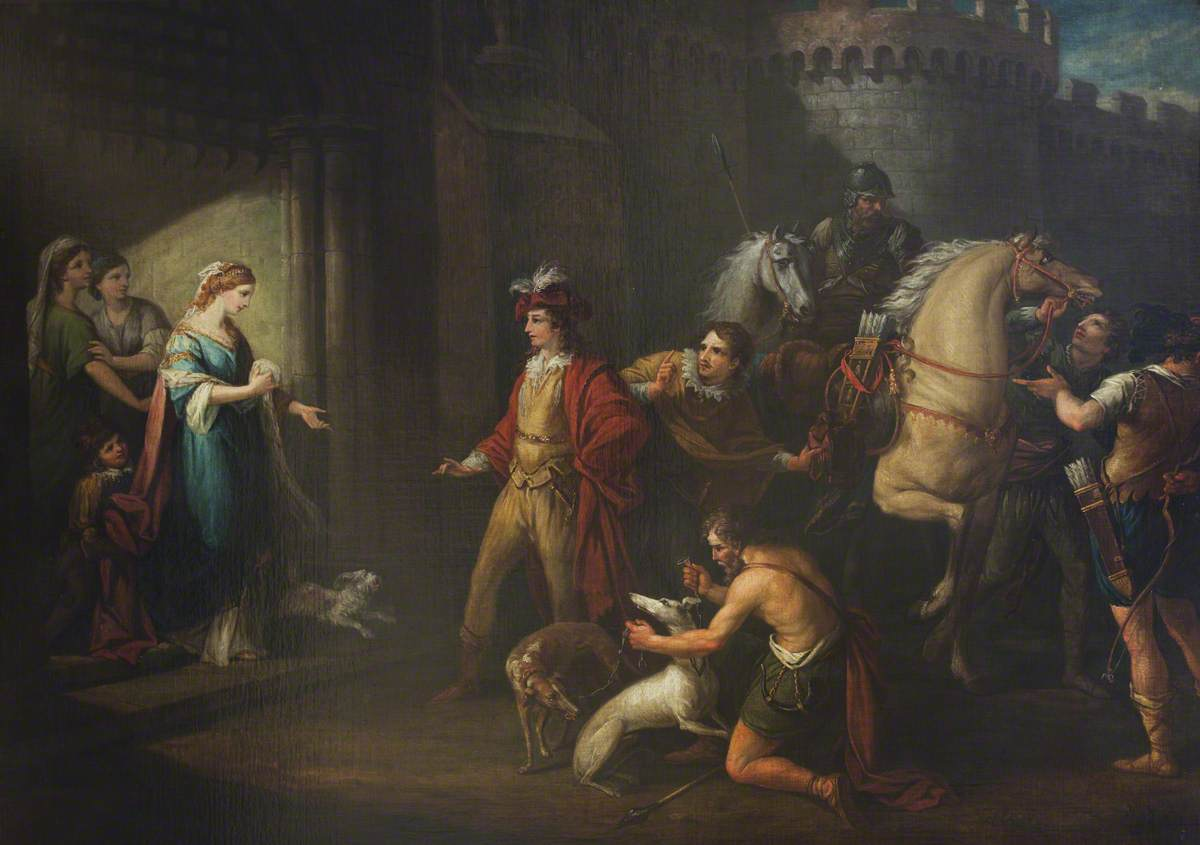
King Edgar's First Interview with Queen Elfrida by William Hamilton, 1774

Edgar had two children before he married Ælfthryth, both of uncertain legitimacy. Edward was probably the son of Æthelflæd, and Eadgifu, later known as Saint Edith of Wilton, was the daughter of Wulfthryth. Sound political reasons encouraged the match between Edgar, whose power base was centred in Mercia, and Ælfthryth, whose family were powerful in Wessex. In addition to this, and her link with the family of Æthelstan Half-King, Ælfthryth also appears to have been connected to the family of Ælfhere, Ealdorman of Mercia.

Edgar married Ælfthryth in either 964 or 965. In 966 Ælfthryth gave birth to a son who was named Edmund. In King Edgar's charter (S 745) regranting privileges to New Minster, Winchester that same year, the infant Edmund is called "clito legitimus" (legitimate ætheling), and appears before Edward in the list of witnesses. Edmund died young, c. 970, but in 968 Ælfthryth had given birth to a second son who was called Æthelred.

King Edgar organised a second coronation on 11 May 973 at Bath, perhaps to bolster his claim to be ruler of all of Britain. Here Ælfthryth was also crowned and anointed, granting her a status higher than any recent queen. The only model of a queen's coronation was that of Judith of Flanders, but this had taken place outside England. One of the emphases of the new rite was her role as protector of religion and the nunneries in the realm. The queen's responsibility for the kingdom's nunneries had been established by the Regularis Concordia, a rule for religious life composed by Ælfthryth's close ally, Bishop Æthelwold of Winchester, as part of the wider English Benedictine Reform. Ælfthryth took a close interest in the well-being of several abbeys, and is reported by Goscelin to have used her authority to depose and later reinstate the abbess of Barking Abbey.

Ælfthryth played a large role as forespeca, or advocate, in at least six legal cases. As such, she formed a key part of the Anglo-Saxon legal system as a mediator between the individual and the crown, which was increasingly viewing its role in the courts as a symbol of its authority as protector of its subjects. Ælfthryth's actions as forespeca were largely for the benefit of female litigants, and her role as a mediator shows the possibilities for women to have legal and political power in late Anglo-Saxon England.

== Queen dowager ==
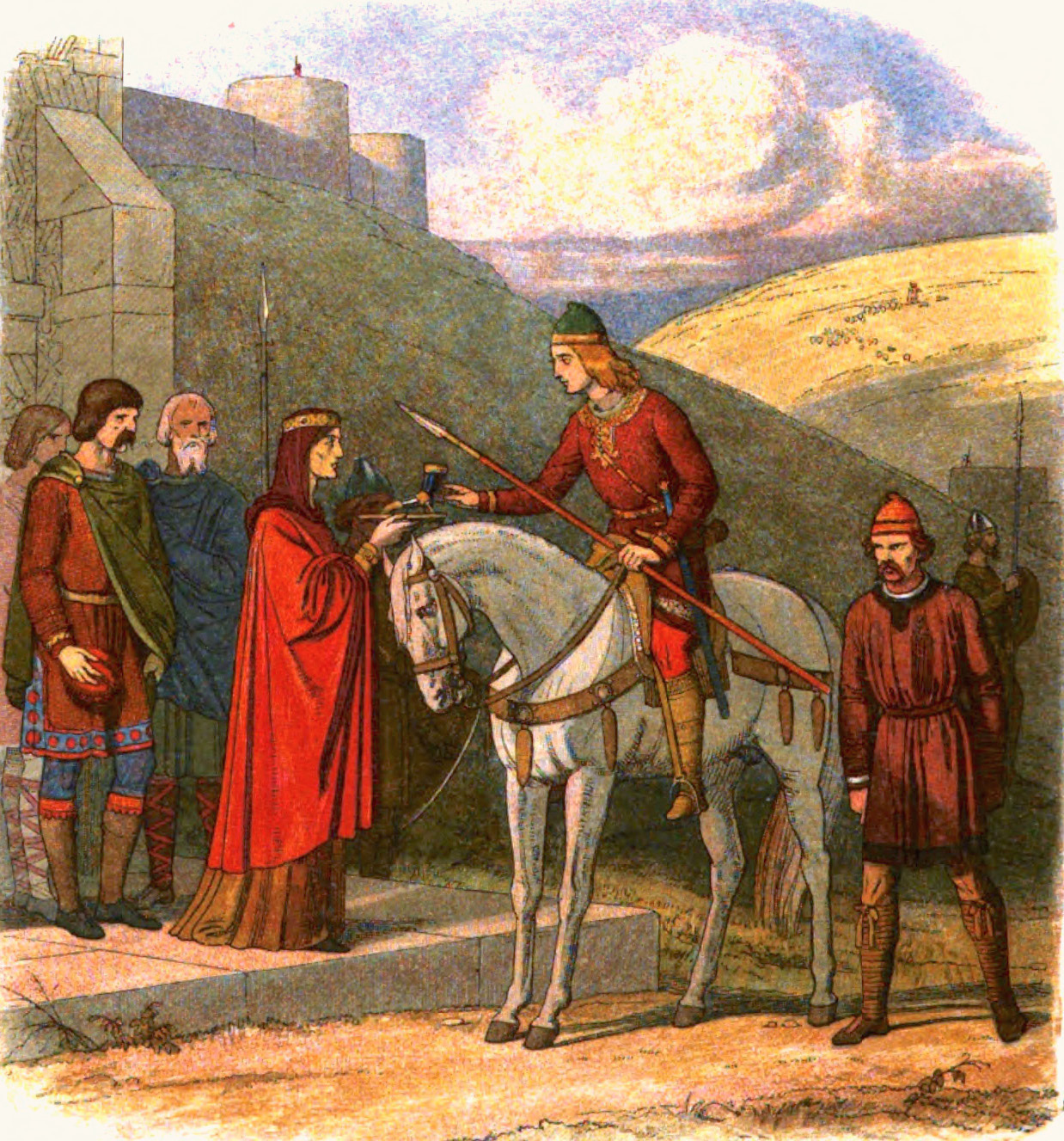
Edward the Martyr is offered a cup of mead by Ælfthryth, wife of Edgar, unaware that her attendant is about to murder him.

Edgar died in 975 leaving two young sons, Edward and Æthelred. Edward was almost an adult, and his successful claim for the throne was supported by many key figures, including Archbishops Dunstan and Oswald and the brother of Ælfthryth's first husband, Æthelwine, Ealdorman of East Anglia. Supporting the unsuccessful claim of Æthelred were Ælfthryth herself (now the Queen dowager) Bishop Æthelwold of Winchester, and Ælfhere, Ealdorman of Mercia.

According to the Anglo-Saxon Chronicle, King Edward was killed at Corfe Castle on 18 March 978, while visiting Ælfthryth. Accounts written over subsequent centuries suggest that he may have been killed by servants of the queen, leaving the way clear for her son Æthelred to be installed as king. As the king developed into a cult figure and martyr, a body of literature grew up around his murder, at first implying Ælfthryth's guilt and later accusing her outright. The 12th century monastic chronicle the Liber Eliensis went so far as to accuse her of being a witch, claiming that she had murdered not only the king, but also Abbot Brihtnoth of Ely.

Within a year of his brother's death Æthelred was confirmed as king of the English. Due to his youth, the country was governed by a regency until her son came of age around 984. The leading figures appear to have been Ælfthryth and her allies, Bishop Æthelwold and Ealdorman Ælfhere. Ælfhere died in 983 and Æthelwold in 984. Æthelred then rebelled against his old advisers, preferring a group of younger nobility. In charter S 745, dated to 966, Ælfthryth was identified as 'legitimate wife of the king', after being crowned queen in 973 she witnessed charters as 'Ælfðryð regina'. She was absent as a witness during the reign of her step-son King Edward, and during the minority of her son King Æthelred, again witnessed charters as 'Ælfðryð regina' (see charter S 843). Towards the end of 983, when King Æthelred was beginning to assert his own authority, she began to sign charters as "Ælfthryth, mother of the king" (see charter S 845).

== Later life ==
Ælfthryth disappears from the list of charter witnesses from around 984. About this time Æthelred married and there was a new queen in the court, Ælfgifu. Ælfthryth reappears as a witness in 993, again as 'mother of the king'. She remained an important figure, being responsible for the care of Æthelred's children by his first wife, Ælfgifu. Æthelred's eldest son, Æthelstan Ætheling, prayed for the soul of the grandmother 'who brought me up' in his will in 1014.

Ælfthryth was a religious woman, taking an especial interest in monastic reform during her queenship. William of Malmesbury reports that she founded both Amesbury Abbey and Wherwell Abbey as Benedictine nunneries, though the foundation histories of both abbeys are poorly attested and there no extant endowment charters. Late in life, according to Gaimar, Ælfthryth retired to Wherwell. but Levi Roach considers Gaimar's report dubious.

Antonia Gransden comments: 'In their patronage of the monks both Cnut and Edward the Confessor were supported by their queens, Emma and Edith, who were worthy successors of Edgar's queen, Ælfthryth, as patronesses of the religious.'

== Death ==
She died at Wherwell on 17 November 999, 1000 or 1001.

== Notes ==
Preceded by Ælfgifu, wife of Eadwig	Queen consort of the English; 965–975	Succeeded by Ælfgifu of York
