= Æthelwine, Ealdorman of East Anglia =

Ealdorman of East Anglia

Æthelwine (died 992) was ealdorman of East Anglia and one of the leading noblemen in the kingdom of England in the later 10th century. As with his kinsmen, the principal source for his life is Byrhtferth's life of Oswald of Worcester. Æthelwine founded Ramsey Abbey in 969, and Byrhtferth and Ramsey Abbey remembered him as Dei amicus (friend to God), but the monks of nearby Ely saw him as an enemy who had seized their lands.

Æthelwine was the son of Æthelstan Half-King and Ælfwynn, but probably not the eldest son as his brother Æthelwald seems to have succeeded their father on his retirement in 956. Æthelwine appears to have followed Æthelwald in office from 962. He was a benefactor of the New Minster at Winchester, and of Ramsey Abbey.

Following the death of King Edgar, Æthelwine was, with Oswald of Worcester and Dunstan, a leader among the supporters of Edgar's oldest son Edward, which placed him in opposition to his former sister-in-law Dowager Queen Ælfthryth and Ælfhere, Ealdorman of Mercia. During the anti-monastic reaction in Edward's short reign, Æthelwine is portrayed as a stalwart supporter of the monks, but the record suggests that he took advantage of the weakness of royal government to dispossess the monks of Ely of lands.

Following the death of Ælfhere in 983, and the withdrawal of the queen-mother from court soon after the death of Bishop Æthelwold of Winchester in 984, Æthelwine became the leading lay figure at the court of the young King Æthelred. His death in 992 probably marks the beginning of Æthelred's personal reign.

Æthelwine's death is recorded by the Anglo-Saxon Chronicle. Byrhtferth provides more detail, reporting that, perhaps following a lengthy illness, Æthelwine was attended at his death by Germann, Abbot of Ramsey, and Ælfheah, later Archbishop of Canterbury. His remains were moved to Ramsey where the monks kept a vigil overnight before he was buried there.

The name of Æthelwine's wife is not recorded, but the names of three sons are known. Byrhtferth mentions Edwin; another son named Leofric appears to have witnessed a will in 986, while Æthelweard was killed fighting for Edmund Ironside at the Battle of Ashingdon in 1016.
