= Ealhhelm =

Anglo-Saxon nobleman and ealdorman

Ealhhelm was an Anglo-Saxon nobleman and ealdorman of central Mercia (now Worcestershire and Gloucestershire) from 940 to 951. His sons were acknowledged as kinsmen by several kings, but the nature of the relationship is unknown.

Ealhhelm is described by the historian Shashi Jayakumar as "an obscure figure who had been ealdorman in Mercia under Edmund". His sons were Ælfhere, Ealdorman of Mercia, Ælfheah, Ælfwine and Eadric. Ælfric Cild may have been his son-in-law.

== Bibliography ==
- Jayakumar, Shashi (2008). "Eadwig and Edgar: Politics, Propaganda, Faction". In Scragg, Donald (ed.). Edgar King of the English: New Interpretations. Woodbridge, Suffolk: The Boydell Press. pp. 83–103. ISBN 978-1-84383-399-4.
- Williams, Ann (2004). "Ælfhere (d. 983)". Oxford Dictionary of National Biography. Oxford University Press. doi:10.1093/ref:odnb/182. ISBN 978-0-19-861412-8. (subscription, Wikipedia Library access or UK public library membership required)
