= Ælfhere, Ealdorman of Mercia =

Ealdorman of Mercia

Ælfhere (died in 983) was Ealdorman of Mercia. His family, along with those of Æthelstan Half-King and Æthelstan Rota, rose to greatness in the middle third of the 10th century. In the reign of Edward the Martyr, Ælfhere was a leader of the anti-monastic reaction and an ally of Edward's stepmother Queen Dowager Ælfthryth. After the killing of Edward by Ælfthryth's servants in 978, Ælfhere supported the new king, Ælfthryth's son Æthelred the Unready, and was the leading nobleman in the Kingdom of England until his death in 983.

== Origins and relations ==
Ælfhere was a son of Ealhhelm (fl. 940–951) who had been one of the several ealdormen in Mercia in the reigns of Kings Edmund and Eadred. The family was of Wessex origin, like most of those prominent in Mercia in the period, and may have been connected to the royal family, probably members of a collateral branch of the Royal house. The family's power-base was probably in south-west Mercia, in the diocese of Worcester, the former Kingdom of the Hwicce. Ælfhere's brother Ælfheah (fl. 959–972) was an important figure, serving as steward to King Eadwig from 956 and as ealdorman of Hampshire from 959. One of Ælfhere's brothers may have been married to a niece of Saint Dunstan.

Ælfhere was promoted by King Eadwig, probably as a counter to the influence of Æthelstan Half-King and his kinsmen. Eadwig's promotion of new men, such as Ælfhere, soon faced opposition from the old guard. The crisis came in 957, and to all appearances was settled by negotiation. The English kingdom was neatly partitioned between Eadwig and his younger brother Edgar, Eadwig ruling south of the Thames, Edgar to the north. Ælfhere survived the crisis, abandoning Eadwig, and became Edgar's devoted supporter.

== Prince of the Mercian people ==
Following the partition of the kingdom, Æthelstan Half-King retired from political life, leaving Ælfhere as the chief ealdorman in Edgar's northern kingdom. From 959 to 975 he was almost always the first witness to Edgar's charters. The Life of Oswald of Worcester written by Abbot Byrhtferth of Ramsey refers to Ælfhere by the impressive title princeps merciorum gentis—prince of the Mercian people, last used in the days of Æthelflæd and Ælfwynn—and as a witness to Oswald's charters he is called "ealdorman of the Mercians." His brother Ælfheah disappears from the record c. 972, and it may be that Ælfhere then became ealdorman of Hampshire or central Wessex.

As the ealdorman of Mercia, Ælfhere was concerned with relations with the Welsh princes. Wars in Wales gave opportunities for fame, and for booty to be distributed to allies and kinsmen. A campaign in 983 by Ælfhere against Brycheiniog and Morgannwg, with the aid of the Welsh king Hywel ap Ieuaf, is recorded by the Annales Cambriae.

== Edward and Æthelred ==
King Edgar's complicated marital relations left two sons on his death in 975. Edward, the elder, was the son of Æthelflæd, daughter of Ordmær, the younger was Æthelred, son of Ælfthryth, daughter of Ordgar. A late source describes Ælfhere as a friend of Ælfthryth, to whom Ælfheah had left lands in his will. As Edward was about fifteen years of age, and Æthelred only six or seven, the disputes from 975 to 978 were not between two rival kings, but between two factions among the notables of the kingdom. Edward was supported by the church—he was crowned by Dunstan, Archbishop of Canterbury, and Oswald of Worcester, by then Archbishop of York—and by Æthelwine, Ealdorman of East Anglia, heir of Æthelstan Half-King. Ælfhere, on the other hand, was counted among the supporters of Æthelred.

The short reign of Edward was the period of the so-called anti-monastic reaction. Ælfhere was portrayed by medieval writers, who were typically monks, as a leader in this movement, which saw the seizure of monastic lands by the magnates. In Ælfhere's case, this appears to have centred on the lands attached to monasteries founded by Oswald of Worcester, which had been greatly enlarged with the assistance of the sons of Æthelstan Half-King.

The reign of Edward came to an end with his murder at Corfe Castle on 18 March 978. His stepmother Queen Ælfthryth was soon blamed for the killing, the details of which are uncertain. Edward was initially buried at Wareham, but in 979 or 980 Ælfhere and Archbishop Dunstan had the remains of the king reburied at Shaftesbury Abbey. Whether Ælfhere wished to publicly disassociate himself from the killing of Edward, or to assuage a guilty conscience—he certainly profited from Edward's death—can only be conjectured.

The Anglo-Saxon Chronicle for the year 983 records Ælfhere's death. He was buried at Glastonbury Abbey. Ælfric Cild, his sister's husband—she may have been called Æthelflæd—succeeded to some of his offices, but was exiled in 985. No children of Ælfhere are known, but two of his nephews appear in the record. Ælfric Cild's son Ælfwine was killed at the Battle of Maldon in 991 and Ælfheah's son Godwine may be the same person as Godwine, ealdorman of Lindsey, who died in the Battle of Ashingdon in 1016.

== Sources ==
- Campbell, John; John, Eric; Wormald, Patrick (1982), The Anglo-Saxons, London: Phaidon, ISBN 0-14-014395-5
- Fisher, D. J. V. (1952), "The Anti-Monastic Reaction in the Reign of Edward the Martyr", Cambridge Historical Journal, 10 (3), Cambridge: Cambridge University Press: 254–270, doi:10.1017/s147469130000295x, JSTOR 3021114
- Henson, Donald (1998), A Guide to Late Anglo-Saxon England: From Ælfred to Eadgar II, Hockwold-cum-Wilton: Anglo-Saxon Books, ISBN 1-898281-21-1
- Higham, Nick (1997), The Death of Anglo-Saxon England, Stroud: Sutton, ISBN 0-7509-2469-1
- Hunt, William (1885). "Ælfhere" . In Stephen, Leslie (ed.). Dictionary of National Biography. Vol. 1. London: Smith, Elder & Co.
- Lapidge, Michael (1999), "Monasticism", in Lapidge, Michael (ed.), The Blackwell Encyclopedia of Anglo-Saxon England, Oxford: Blackwell, ISBN 0-631-22492-0
- Maddicott, J.R. (2010), The Origins of the English Parliament, 924-1327, Oxford: Oxford University Press, ISBN 978-0-19-958550-2
- Stafford, Pauline (1989), Unification and Conquest: A Political and Social History of England in the Tenth and Eleventh Centuries, London: Edward Arnold, ISBN 0-7131-6532-4
- Stenton, Frank (1971), Anglo-Saxon England (3rd ed.), Oxford: Oxford University Press, ISBN 0-19-280139-2
- Williams, Ann (2003), Æthelred the Unready: The Ill-Counselled King, London: Hambeldon & London, ISBN 1-85285-382-4
- Williams, Ann (2004). "Ælfhere (d. 983)". Oxford Dictionary of National Biography. Oxford Dictionary of National Biography (online ed.). Oxford: Oxford University Press. doi:10.1093/ref:odnb/182. (Subscription, Wikipedia Library access or UK public library membership required.)
- Williams, Ann (1982), "Princeps Merciorum Gentis: The Family, Career and Connections of Ælfhere, Ealdorman of Mercia", Anglo-Saxon England, 10, Cambridge: Cambridge University Press: 143–172, doi:10.1017/s0263675100003240
