= Heriot =

Death-duty in late Anglo-Saxon England

Heriot, from Old English heregeat ("war-gear"), was originally a death-duty in late Anglo-Saxon England, which required that at death, a nobleman provided to his king a given set of military equipment, often including horses, swords, shields, spears and helmets. It later developed into a kind of tenurial feudal relief due from villeins. The equivalent term in French was droit du meilleur catel.

== Etymology ==
The word derives from Old English here-geatwa, meaning the arms and equipment (geatwa) of a soldier or army (here).

== History ==
An example of heriot was the right of a lord in feudal Europe to seize a serf's best horse, clothing, or both, upon his death. It arose from the tradition of the lord lending a serf a horse or armour or weapons to fight so that when the serf died the lord would rightfully reclaim his property. In England, heriot is first mentioned in the wills of West-Saxon nobles in the mid-tenth century, such as that of Æthelmær the Stout. Large bequests were made to the king, especially of war gear, in return for the king's permission to make a will and for his support in ensuring that the provisions of the will were carried out. The regulation of levels of heriot is the subject of a clause in Cnut's secular law-code (II Cnut § 71), drawn up between 1020 and 1023. The form of this duty depended on the rank of the nobleman (earl, king's thegn, median thegn) and on his region (Danelaw, Wessex).

When knights as a class emerged and were later able to acquire their own fighting instruments, the lord continued to claim rights to property upon death, extending sometimes to everyone and not just the fighting knights. Serfs could make provisions for heriot in their wills, but death in battle often meant no heriot was required, because the winner of a fight would often take horse and armour anyway as was often the custom. By the 13th century the payment was made either in money or in kind by handing over the best beast or chattel of the tenant. The enlightened cleric Jacques de Vitry called lords who imposed heriots "vultures that prey upon death... worms feeding upon the corpse."

Heriot came in many varieties. G. G. Coulton reports a curious case of heriot in modern times:

In the later 19th century Lord Rothschild bought an estate of which part was copyhold under New College, Oxford. The Warden and Fellows, therefore, were in that respect his lords, and he had to redeem the freehold in all haste lest, at his death, these overlords should claim as a heriot his best beast which, in the case of so distinguished a racing man as Rothschild, might have been worth twenty thousand pounds or more.

Heriot is one of the many curious laws from feudal times that started because of a logical need between two parties, and persisted because a lord's customary rights tended to continue on even when their original reason no longer existed. This law and many others, such as the noble right not to pay taxes, have a long and contentious history in Europe. It was legally abolished in Britain in 1922.

== See also ==
- Copyhold (the manorial law relating to heriot).
- Heriot in Switzerland
- Anglo-Saxon weaponry

== Sources ==
- Brooks, Nicholas (1978). "Arms, status and warfare in late-Saxon England". In Hill, David (ed.). Ethelred the Unready: papers from the millenary conference. BAR British series. Vol. 59. Oxford: British Archaeological Reports. pp. 81–103. ISBN 086054043X.
- Pracy, Stuart (2024). "Royal Power and the Heriots of Ealdormen and Bishops". In Blanchard, Mary; Riedel, Christopher (eds.). The Reigns of Edmund, Eadred and Eadwig, 939-959: New Interpretations. Woodbridge, UK: The Boydell Press. pp. 80–97. ISBN 978-1-78327-764-3.
