= Levi Roach =

Medieval historian

Levi Roach (born 30 June 1985) is an academic, a medievalist and historian of Anglo-Saxon England and Holy Roman Empire (Germany), specialising in kingship, governance, and diplomatic.

As a student he studied at the University of Cambridge and the Ruprecht-Karls-Universität, Heidelberg, completing his PhD at Trinity College, Cambridge in 2011. Between 2011 and 2012 he held a fellowship with St John's College, Cambridge, and subsequently in 2012 became a lecturer at the University of Exeter. From 2024 he has held a personal chair in Medieval History and Diplomatic.

== Select publications ==
- Kingship and Consent in Anglo-Saxon England, 871–978 : Assemblies and the State in the Early Middle Ages (Cambridge: Cambridge University Press, 2013)
- Æthelred the Unready (New Haven: Yale University Press, 2016)
- Forgery and Memory at the End of the First Millennium (Princeton: Princeton University Press, 2021)
- Empires of the Normans : Makers of Europe, Conquerors of Asia (London: John Murray, 2022)

His work on Æthelred the Unready won the Longman-History Today Prize and the Labarge Prize in 2017, the latter representing the "prize for the best book published by a Canadian medievalist" for the relevant year.
