= Pauline Stafford =

20th and 21st-century British historian of the Middle Ages

- Born: Pauline Ann Johnson; 1 September 1946 (age 80); Leeds
- Citizenship: British
- Education: St Theresa's Roman Catholic Primary School, Leeds; Mount St Mary's Girls Grammar School, Leeds; Lady Margaret Hall, Oxford
- Scientific career
- Fields: Anglo-Saxon England
- Workplaces: Huddersfield University; Liverpool University

Pauline Stafford is Professor Emerita of Early Medieval History at Liverpool University and a visiting professor at Leeds University in England. Dr. Stafford is a former vice-president of the Royal Historical Society.

== Scholarship ==
Her work focuses on the history of women and gender in England from the eighth to the early twelfth century, and on the same topics in the history of the Franks from the eighth to the ninth century, as well as on the Anglo-Saxon Chronicles after Alfred.

== Education ==
Stafford studied medieval history at Oxford. Her PhD thesis on Aethelraed the Unready was supervised by Pierre Chaplais and examined by Henry Loyn and Karl Leyser.

== Selected publications ==
- 2020. After Alfred: Anglo-Saxon Chronicles and Chroniclers, 900-1150 (Oxford: Oxford University Press). ISBN 9780198859642
- 2008. "'The Annals of Æthelflæd'. Annals, History and Politics in Early Tenth-Century England." In Myth, rulership, church and charters. Essays in honour of Nicholas Brooks, ed. Julia Barrow and Andrew Wareham. Aldershot: Ashgate. 101–16.
- 2007. "The Anglo-Saxon Chronicles, identity and the making of England." Haskins Society Journal 19: 28–50.
- 2006. Gender, Family and the Legitimation of Power: England from the Ninth to Early Twelfth Century. Variorum Collected Studies Series. Ashgate, Aldershot.
- 2001. "Political ideas in late tenth-century England. Charters as evidence." In Law, laity and solidarities. Essays in honour of Susan Reynolds, ed. P. Stafford, J. Nelson and J. Martindale. Manchester: Manchester University Press. 68-82
- 2001. "Political women in Mercia, eighth to early tenth centuries." In Mercia. An Anglo-Saxon kingdom in Europe, ed. M.P. Brown and C.A. Farr. London: Leicester University Press. 35–49.
- 1999. "Queens, nunneries and reforming churchmen. Gender, religious status and reform in tenth- and eleventh-century England." Past and Present 163: 3-35.
- 1997. Queen Emma and Queen Edith: queenship and women's power in eleventh-century England. Oxford and Cambridge (MA): Blackwell Publishers.
- 1994. "Women and the Norman Conquest". Transactions of the Royal Historical Society 6th series, Vol 4:221-249.
- 1993. "The portrayal of royal women in England, mid-tenth to mid-twelfth centuries." In Medieval queenship, ed. J.C. Parsons. Stroud: Sutton, 1993. 143–67, 217–20.
- 1989. Unification and conquest. A political and social history of England in the tenth and eleventh centuries.
- 1985. The East Midlands in the early Middle Ages. Leicester.
- 1983. Queens, Concubines and Dowagers. The Kings's Wife in the Early Middle Ages.
- 1981. "The king's wife in Wessex 800-1066." Past and Present 91: 3-27.
