= Andrew Wareham =

British historian (born 1965)

Andrew Wareham (born 1965) is a British historian who has written numerous books and articles on Anglo-Saxon history, Anglo-Norman history and the hearth tax. He is employed as a reader in the department of humanities at Roehampton University, London.

== Education and career ==
He was educated at Birmingham University (BA, PhD, PGCE) and King's College London (MA). His doctoral dissertation, supervised by Nicholas Brooks and completed in 1992, investigated the late Anglo-Saxon and Anglo-Norman aristocracy in East Anglia. After working as a temporary lecturer in medieval history at the Universities of Manchester and Oxford (1992–4), he was employed by the Institute of Historical Research (1995–2002). His connections through family and friends with South/East Asia led to his work on the comparative history of Europe and South/East Asia in the early middle ages, partly completed while an academic visitor at the Department of Economic History, LSE and the Department of Economics, Lingnan University (2003–4).

He was a research associate in the Department of Digital Humanities at King’s College London (2003–6) working on the AHRC Durham Liber Vitae project, and in 2006 he was appointed as director of the British Academy Hearth Tax Project (Centre for Hearth Tax Research) in the Department of Humanities at Roehampton University. In 2007 he was promoted to reader in medieval & early modern history. In 2010 John Price, Ruth Selman and Wareham established the first digital portal for the publication of hearth tax records (Hearth Tax Online, 2010). In 2019 this was replaced by Hearth Tax Digital, which was designed by Georg Vogeler and Wareham, and arises from a partnership between the British Academy Hearth Tax Project and Centre for Information Modeling, and provides a new approach to researching the Restoration hearth tax. Users can read and search the returns with all their contextual information and in the original order in which the documents were written and search all the data across counties and returns in the advanced search function, with the enquiries providing the other names which were listed with the name being searched for. This transforms the nature of family history searches for genealogists and through the advanced search and database function provides a powerful research tool for historians.

== Bibliography ==
=== Books ===
- (ed. with H. B. Teunis & A. J. Bijsterveld) Negotiating Secular and Ecclesiastical Power: Western Europe in the Central Middle Ages (Brepols, 1999)
- A History of the County of Cambridge and the Isle of Ely: X. Cheveley, Flendish, Staine and Staploe Hundreds (2002)
- Lords and Communities in Early Medieval East Anglia (Boydell & Brewer, 2005)
- (ed. with Julia Barrow) Myth, Rulership, Church and Charters: Essays in Honour of Nicholas Brooks (2008)
- (with Colin Phillips, Catherine Ferguson) Westmorland Hearth Tax, Michaelmas 1670 and Surveys 1674-5 (2009)
- (with David Hey, Colum Giles & Margaret Spufford) Yorkshire West Riding Hearth Tax Assessment, Lady Day 1672 (2007)
- (with Catherine Ferguson and Chris Thornton) Essex hearth tax return Michaelmas 1670 (London) (2012)
- (with Matthew Davies, Catherine Ferguson, Vanessa Harding and Elizabeth Parkinson) London and Middlesex 1666 hearth tax (London), 2 vols (2014)

=== Articles ===
- ‘The motives and politics of the Bigod family c.1066-1177’, Anglo-Norman Studies, 17 (1994)
- 'St Oswald’s family and kin', in St Oswald of Worcester: Life and Influence, eds. N.P. Brooks and C.R.E. Cubitt (Leicester University Press, 1996)
- 'The Feudal Revolution in Eleventh-Century East Anglia', Anglo-Norman Studies 22 (1999), pp. 293–322
- with Arnoud-Jan Bijsterveld and Henk Teunis), eds., Negotiating secular and ecclesiastical power: Western Europe in the central middle ages (Turnhout) (1999)
- ‘Two models of marriage: kinship and the social order in England and Normandy’ in Bijstervled et al., eds, Negotiating secular and ecclesiastical power (1999)
- 'The Transformation of Kinship and the Family in late Anglo-Saxon England', Early Medieval Europe 10 (2001), pp. 375–99
- 'Water management and the economic environment in Eastern England, China and the Low Countries c.960-1660: comparisons and consequences', Jaarboek voor Ecologische Geschiedenis (2005/6)
- ‘Kinship’ in M. Schaus, ed, Women and gender in medieval Europe (London) (2006)
- ‘The ordines of the original core’ & ‘Alliance and unification strategies in libri vitae’ in D. and L. Rollason, eds, Durham Liber Vitae, III (London) (2007)
- (with John Moore and Lynda Rollason) ‘Laity: kings, queens and princesses’, ‘Laity: aristocracy, gentry and their entourages’, ‘Laity: other’ in D. and L. Rollason, eds, Durham Liber Vitae, III (London) (2007)
- (with Elizabeth Briggs and David Rollason), ‘Original core’ in D. and L. Rollason, eds, Durham Liber Vitae, III (London) (2007)
- (with Xiaagdong Wei) 'Taxation and the Economy in Late Eleventh-Century England: reviving the Domesday regression debate', Anglo-Norman Studies 29 (2007), pp. 214–27
- (with Alex Burghart) ‘Was there an agricultural revolution in Anglo-Saxon England?’ in Barrow and Wareham, Myth, Rulership, Church and Charters (2008)
- ‘The hearth tax and empty properties in London on the eve of the Great Fire’ The Local Historian, 41 (2011)
- ‘Fiscal policies and the institution of a tax state in Anglo-Saxon England within a comparative context’ Economic History Review, 65 (2012)
- ‘The redaction of cartularies and economic upheaval in Western England c. 996-1096’ Anglo-Norman Studies, 36 (2013)
- (with Dominic Goodall) ‘The political significance of gifts of power in the Khmer and Mercian kingdoms, 793-926’, Medieval Worlds, 6 (2017)
- ‘The unpopularity of the hearth tax and the social geography of London in 1666’ Economic History Review, 70 (2017)

=== Online ===
- (with Ruth Selman and John Price) Hearth Tax Online: householders in late 17th century England (Roehampton) (2010)
- (with Georg Vogeler, Theresa Dellinger. Jakob Sonnberger and Aaron Columbus) Hearth Tax Digital (Graz & Roehampton) (2019)
