= Ealdorman =

Term in Anglo-Saxon England for a man of high status

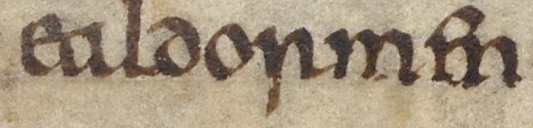
A mention of ealdormen in the Anglo-Saxon Chronicle

Ealdorman (/ˈɔːldərmən/ AWL-dər-mən or /(eɪ)ˈældərmən/ (ay-)AL-dər-mən, Old English: [ˈæɑɫdorˌmɑn]) was an office in the government of Anglo-Saxon England. During the 11th century, it evolved into the title of earl.

== Early use ==
The Old English word ealdorman was applied to high-ranking men. It was equated with several Latin titles, including princeps, dux, comes, and praefectus. The title could be applied to kings of weaker territories who had submitted to a greater power. For example, a charter of King Offa of Mercia described Ealdred of Hwicce as "subregulus ... et dux ('underking and ealdorman')."

In Wessex, the king appointed ealdormen to lead individual shires. Under Alfred the Great (r. 871–899), there were nine or ten ealdormen. Each West Saxon shire had one, and Kent had two (one for East Kent and one for West Kent).

== 10th century ==
From the late ninth to the 10th century, the kings of Wessex unified the Heptarchy into the Kingdom of the Anglo-Saxons, then the Kingdom of the English, then into the Kingdom of England. Ealdormen became the local representatives of the monarch. The ealdorman commanded the shire's fyrd (army), co-presided with the bishop over the shire court, and enforced royal orders. He had a right to the "third penny": one-third of the income from the shire court and one-third of the revenue from tolls and dues levied in the boroughs. The king could remove ealdormen.

Starting with Edward the Elder (r. 899–924), it became customary for one ealdorman to administer three or four shires together as an ealdormanry. One ealdormanry covered Wessex east of Selwood and another covered Wessex west of Selwood. By 965, Mercia had four or five ealdormen and Northumbria only one. The boundaries of the ealdormanries are unknown, and they may not have covered the entire kingdom. It is possible that the king kept some areas under his personal jurisdiction.

In the 11th century, the term eorl, today's earl, replaced that of ealdorman, but this reflected a change in terminology under Danish influence rather than a change in function.

== Notable ealdormen ==
- Æthelstan Half-King
- Æthelmund, Ealdorman of the Hwicce
- Ælfhere, ealdorman of Mercia (d. 983)
- Ælfhelm, ealdorman of southern Northumbria (d. c. 1006)
- Ælfric, ealdorman of Hampshire
- Æthelweard the Chronicler
- Byrhtnoth, ealdorman of Essex (d. 991)
- Eadric Streona, ealdorman of the Mercians (d. 1017)
- Odda, Ealdorman of Devon (fl. 878)
- Wulfhere, Ealdorman of Wiltshire (fl. c. 855–877)
- Wulfstan, ealdorman of Wiltshire (d. 802)

== See also ==
- Alderman
- Earls, ealdormen and high-reeves of Bamburgh
- Starosta, the Slavic equivalent of ealdorman
