= Byrhtferth =

English Christian monk and writer

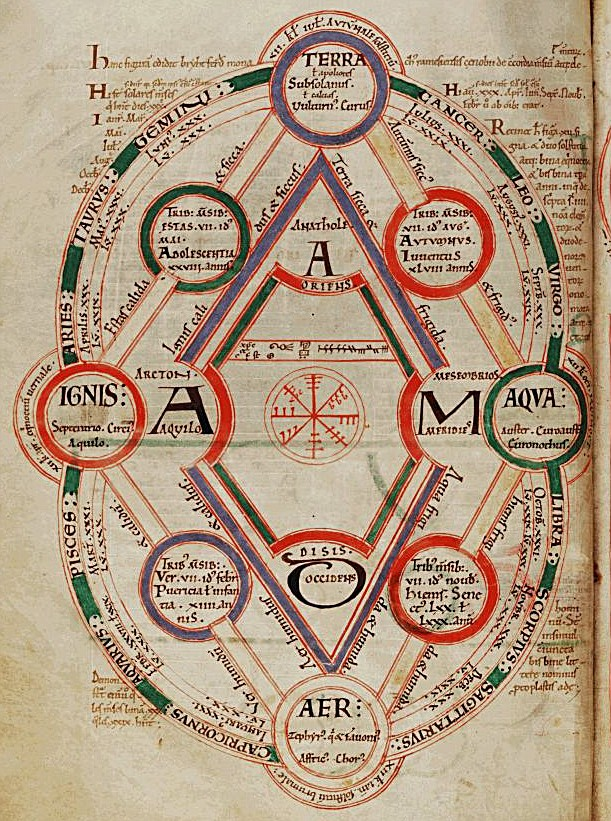
Byrhtferth's diagram with the Four elements (earth, water, air, fire), seasons, solstices, equinoxes, signs of the zodiac and ages of man. An Ogham inscription is in the centre. Miniature from the twelfth-century English medieval manuscript MS Oxford St John's College 17, folium 7 verso. Copy from original about 1000 AD by Byrhtferth.

Byrhtferth (Old English: Byrhtferð; c. 970 – c. 1020) was a priest and monk who lived at Ramsey Abbey in Huntingdonshire (now part of Cambridgeshire) in England. He had a deep impact on the intellectual life of later Anglo-Saxon England and wrote many computistic, hagiographic, and historical works. He was a leading man of science and best known as the author of many different works (although he may not have written many of them). His Manual (Enchiridion), a scientific textbook, is Byrhtferth's best known work.

He studied with Abbo of Fleury, who was invited to Ramsey Abbey by Oswald of Worcester to help teach. Abbo was there during the period 985 to 987, and became a large influence on Byhrtferth who was interested in the same studies, such as history, logic, astronomy, and mathematics. We do not have contemporary biographies of Byrhtferth, and the only information we have is that given in his Manual and his Preface.

== Works ==
Byrhtferth's signature appears on only two unpublished works, his Latin and Old English Manual, and Latin Preface. He also composed a Latin life of St. Egwin, compiled a chronicle of Northumbrian history in the 990s, wrote a Latin life of Oswald of Worcester (the Vita Oswaldi) about the year 1000, and it is suggested that he is responsible for the early sections of the Historia regum, or History of the Kings, attributed to Simeon of Durham. This last attribution is based on the similarity of the style between Simeon and Byrhtferth. An unsigned fragment of Old English text on computus in the Manuscript BL Cotton Caligula A.xv is attributed to him because of the stylistic similarity to the Old English that he wrote in the Manual. Cyril Roy Hart also tentatively identifies him as the author of the verse Menologium preserved as a preface to a manuscript of the Anglo-Saxon Chronicle, although Kazutomo Karasawa believes it more likely to have been written by an older contemporary.

Byrhtferth has also been credited with Latin commentaries on Bede's De natura rerum and De temporum ratione (first attributed to him by John Herwagen) and a Vita S. Dunstani signed "B" (first attributed to him by Jean Mabillon). However, many scholars argue that these works were not written by Byrhtferth, but instead were a compilation of material by several writers in the late ninth and early tenth centuries. This is argued because of the smooth, polished style of these works in comparison with the styles of the only signed works, the Manual and the Preface.

- Bodl. Ashmole MS 328 preserves Byrhtferth's Latin Enchiridion, or Manual. It is written in Latin and Old English and the largest part is that of a computus similar to the one in Preface. It touches on the belief that the divine order of the universe can be perceived through the study of numbers and it is valuable for the study of medieval number symbolism. It also contains treatises on rhetorical and grammatical subjects, a table of weights and measures, and three theological tracts on the ages of the world, the loosing of Satan and the eight capital sins.

St John's College, Oxford MS 17 contains several computistical works by Bede and Helperic, and a computus which includes the Latin Epilogus ("Preface") by Byrhtferth. He also constructed a full-page diagram showing the harmony of the universe, and suggesting correspondences among cosmological, numerological, and physiological aspects of the world. Other items in the manuscript may in fact have been written by Byrhtferth, but this cannot be proved. Also, he may have compiled most of this material from works that Abbo of Fleury left behind at Ramsey Abbey after his death.

== Published works ==
- Lapidge, Michael, ed. (2009). Byrhtferth of Ramsey: The Lives of St Oswald and St Ecgwine. Oxford, UK: Clarendon Press. ISBN 978-0-19-955078-4.
- Byrhtferth's Manual (AD 1011) (1929). Edited from ms. Ashmole 328 in the Bodleian library. With an introduction, translation, sources, vocabulary, glossary of technical terms, appendices and seventeen plates by Samuel J. Crawford. Published for Early English Text Society, Original series, 127.
- Byrhtferth's Enchiridion, edited and translated by Peter S. Baker and Michael Lapidge. Oxford: Published for the Early English Text Society, Supplementary series, 15, by the Oxford University Press, 1995.
