= Æthelbald, King of Wessex =

9th-century King of Wessex

Æthelbald
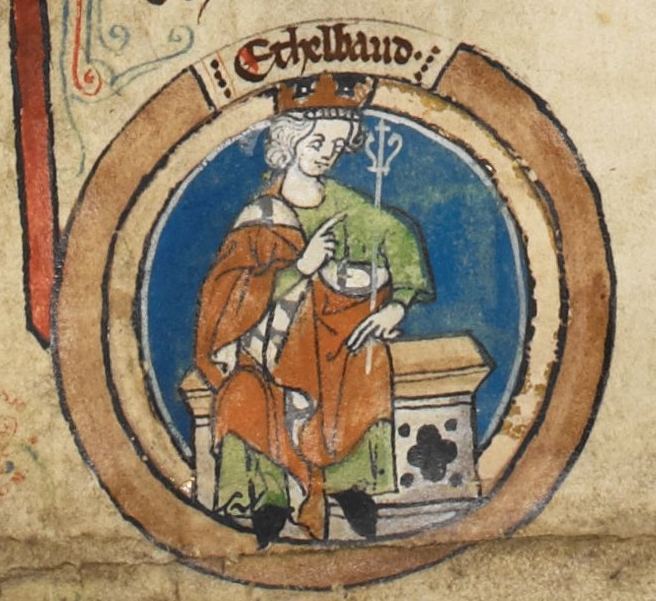
- Æthelbald in the early 14th-century Genealogical Roll of the Kings of England

King of Wessex
- Reign: 855 or 858 – 860
- Predecessor: Æthelwulf
- Successor: Æthelberht
- Died: c. July 860
- Burial: Sherborne, Dorset
- Spouse: Judith of Flanders (m. 858)
- House: Wessex
- Father: Æthelwulf
- Mother: Osburh?

Æthelbald (died 860) was King of Wessex from 855 or 858 to 860. He was the second of five sons of King Æthelwulf. In 850, Æthelbald's elder brother Æthelstan defeated the Vikings in the first recorded sea battle in English history, but he is not recorded afterwards and probably died in the early 850s. The next year Æthelwulf and Æthelbald inflicted another defeat on the Vikings at the Battle of Aclea. In 855, Æthelwulf went on pilgrimage to Rome and appointed Æthelbald King of Wessex, while Æthelberht, the next oldest son, became King of Kent, which had been conquered by Wessex thirty years earlier.

On his way back from Rome, Æthelwulf stayed for several months with Charles the Bald, King of the West Franks, whose twelve-year-old daughter Judith he married. When he returned to England in 856, Æthelbald refused to give up the crown. Most historians believe that Æthelbald continued to be king of Wessex while Æthelberht gave up Kent to his father, but some think that Wessex itself was divided, with Æthelbald ruling the west and his father the east, while Æthelberht kept Kent. When Æthelwulf died in 858, Æthelbald continued as (or became again) king of Wessex and his brother resumed (or carried on) his kingship of Kent.

Æthelbald married his stepmother Judith. Asser, the biographer of his youngest brother, Alfred the Great, denounced Æthelbald and Judith's union as being "against God's prohibition and Christian dignity, and also contrary to the practice of all pagans", but the marriage does not seem to have been condemned at the time. Æthelbald and Æthelberht appear to have been on good terms: when Æthelbald died in 860, Æthelberht became king of both Wessex and Kent, and they were never again divided.

== Background ==
When Æthelbald's grandfather Ecgberht became king of Wessex in 802, it would have seemed very unlikely that he would establish a lasting dynasty. For two hundred years, three families had fought for the West Saxon throne, and no son had followed his father as king. Ecgberht's nearest connection to a king of Wessex was as a great-great-grandson of Ingild, brother of King Ine (688–726), but he was believed to be a paternal descendant of Cerdic, the founder of the West Saxon dynasty, which made him an ætheling, a prince who had a legitimate claim to the throne. However, in the ninth and tenth centuries, Ecgberht's line controlled the kingdom, and all kings were sons of kings.

At the beginning of the ninth century, England was almost wholly under the control of the Anglo-Saxons, and the Midland kingdom of Mercia dominated southern England. In 825, Ecgberht decisively defeated the Mercians at the Battle of Ellendun, ending Mercian supremacy. The two kingdoms became allies, which was important in the resistance to Viking attacks. In 835, the Isle of Sheppey in Kent was ravaged. In 836, Ecgberht was defeated by the Vikings at Carhampton in Somerset, but in 838, he was victorious over an alliance of Cornishmen and Vikings at the Battle of Hingston Down, reducing Cornwall to the status of a client kingdom. He died in the following year and was succeeded by his son Æthelwulf, who appointed his eldest son Æthelstan as sub-king of Kent, Essex, Surrey and Sussex, in the same year.

== Early life ==
Æthelbald was the second son of King Æthelwulf and probably of his first wife Osburh, who was the mother of Alfred the Great. As Æthelstan was old enough to be appointed king ten years before Alfred was born in 849, and Æthelbald took part in the battle in 851, some historians argue that it is more likely that the elder children were born to an unrecorded earlier wife. Æthelstan died before his father, but Æthelbald and his three younger brothers were successively kings of Wessex: Æthelbald reigned from 855 to 860, Æthelberht from 860 to 865, Æthelred I from 865 to 871, and Alfred the Great from 871 to 899. Æthelbald is first recorded when he witnessed a charter of his father (S 290 (Note: S refers to the Sawyer catalogue of Anglo-Saxon charters.)) in 840 as filius regis (the king's son). He attested with the same designation in the 840s, to S 300 in 850 as dux filius regis and in the early 850s as dux (ealdorman). In 850 his elder brother Æthelstan defeated a Danish fleet off Sandwich in the first recorded naval battle in English history, but he is not recorded thereafter and probably died soon afterwards. In 851, Æthelwulf and Æthelbald defeated the Vikings at the Battle of Aclea and, according to the Anglo-Saxon Chronicle, "we have never heard of a greater slaughter of them, in any region, on any one day, before or since". At Easter in 854, Æthelbald and his younger brother Æthelberht attested charters as dux, and in 855 their father went on pilgrimage to Rome and appointed Æthelbald as king of Wessex while Æthelberht became king of Kent, Essex, Surrey and Sussex.

== Division of the kingdom ==
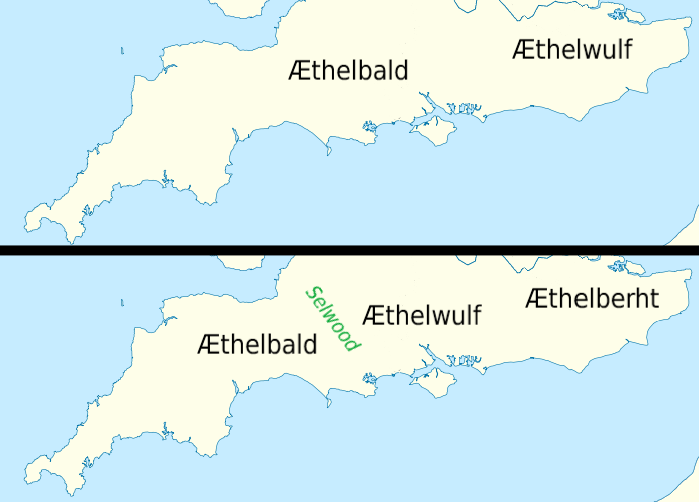
The two possible interpretations of Asser's description of the divided Wessex

Æthelwulf spent a year in Rome. On his way back he stayed for several months with Charles the Bald, King of the West Franks, and married Charles's twelve-year-old daughter Judith, a great-granddaughter of Charlemagne; the bishop of Rheims ceremonially consecrated her and Æthelwulf conferred the title of queen on her. Æthelwulf returned with his new wife in October 856, and according to Alfred the Great's biographer, Bishop Asser, during his absence a plot was hatched to prevent the king's return and keep Æthelbald on the throne. Asser regarded it as "a terrible crime: expelling the king from his own kingdom; but God did not allow it to happen, nor would the nobles of the whole Saxon land have any part in it". Asser stated that a great many men said that the initiative for "this wretched incident, unheard of in all previous ages" came from Æthelbald's chief counsellors, Eahlstan, Bishop of Sherborne and Eanwulf, Ealdorman of Somerset, who had been two of Æthelwulf's most senior advisers, while many blamed Æthelbald himself.

Historians give varying explanations for both the marriage and the rebellion. D. P. Kirby and Pauline Stafford see the match as sealing an anti-Viking alliance. Another factor was Judith's descent from Charlemagne: a union with her gave Æthelwulf a share in Carolingian prestige. Kirby describes her anointing as "a charismatic sanctification which enhanced her status, blessed her womb and conferred additional throne-worthiness on her male offspring." These marks of a special status implied that a son of hers would succeed to at least part of Æthelwulf's kingdom, and explain Æthelbald's decision to rebel. He may also have feared that he would be disadvantaged if his father returned to rule Wessex while his brother kept Kent. Michael Enright argues that an alliance against the Vikings between such distant territories would have served no useful purpose. He sees the marriage as following Æthelbald's rebellion and being a response to it, intending that a son of Judith would displace Æthelbald as successor to the throne. Janet Nelson goes further, seeing Æthelwulf's pilgrimage as intended from the start to enhance his prestige to assist him in facing down filial resentments. Kirby and Sean Miller argue that it is unlikely that Charles would have agreed to his daughter being taken to a country in a state of civil war, so Æthelbald's revolt was probably a response to the marriage, which threatened to produce sons who had a stronger claim to the throne than he had. Richard Abels argues that Æthelbald probably hoped that his rule would be permanent: "All knew the dangers that attended a pilgrimage to Rome and were aware of the possibility that Æthelwulf would not return. His departure to Rome all but invited the prowling of hungry æthelings." Charles may have agreed to the marriage because he was under attack both from Vikings and from a rising among his own nobility, and Æthelwulf had great prestige due to his victories over the Vikings. The marriage added the West Saxon king to the network of royal and princely allies that Charles was creating.

Rivalry between east and west Wessex may have also been a factor in the dispute. The ancient Selwood Forest marked the boundary between the bishoprics of Sherborne in the west and Winchester in the east. In the eighth century, the connections of Ecgberht's family were with the west, but in the early ninth century, the family became close to the clergy of Winchester, who helped them to establish an exclusive hold on the throne for their royal branch. According to Asser, the plot to rob Æthelwulf of his throne was concocted in "the western part of Selwood", and Æthelbald's chief supporters, Eahlstan and Eanwulf, were western magnates who probably resented the favour shown by Æthelwulf to the eastern Winchester diocese, and to Swithun, who was appointed by Æthelwulf as Bishop of Winchester in 852. Æthelbald's patronage was mainly directed at Sherborne.

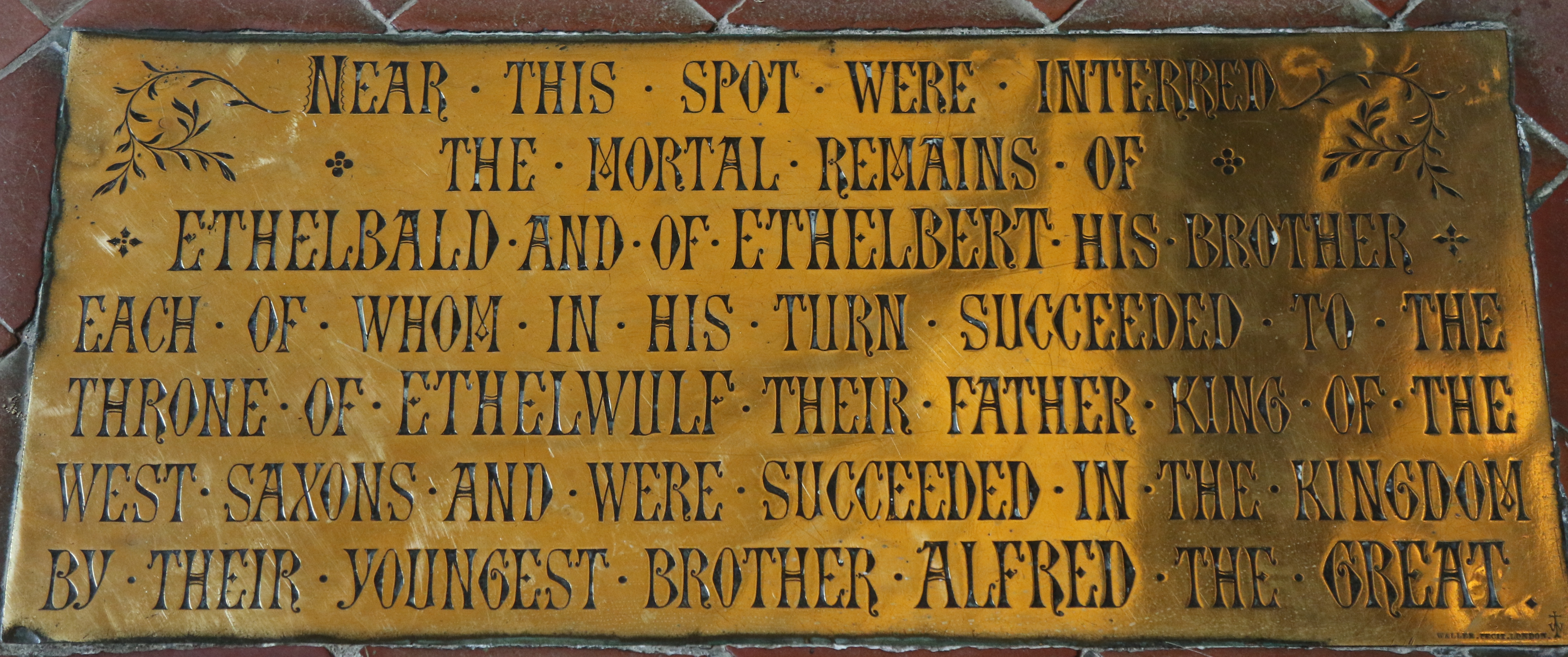
Memorial to Æthelbald and Æthelberht in Sherborne Abbey

Asser is the sole source for the dispute between Æthelwulf and Æthelbald, which is not mentioned in the Anglo-Saxon Chronicle, and according to Asser when Æthelwulf returned to England he agreed to divide the kingdom to avoid a civil war. Most historians state that Æthelbald kept Wessex while Æthelberht agreed to surrender the south-eastern kingdoms of Kent, Essex, Surrey and Sussex to Æthelwulf, although Simon Keynes thinks that Æthelwulf kept a degree of sovereignty. Some historians argue that it is more likely that Wessex itself was divided, with Æthelbald keeping his power base west of Selwood, Æthelwulf taking the east and Æthelberht keeping Kent. Pauline Stafford and D. P. Kirby point out that Asser implies that Judith became queen of the West Saxons in 856. Sean Miller observes that Asser complained that the "son ruled where by rightful judgment the father should have done; for the western part of the Saxon land has always been more important than the eastern", and since Kent had been conquered only thirty years previously, it did not make sense to speak of it as having always been a less important part of the kingdom.

== Kingship ==
According to Asser, at the end of his life, Æthelwulf directed that his kingdom should be divided between his two eldest sons, and this was carried out when he died on 13 January 858. Æthelbald then continued (or resumed) as king of Wessex, while Æthelberht resumed (or kept) the kingship of Kent and the south-east. Æthelwulf left a bequest to Æthelbald, Æthelred and Alfred, with the provision that whoever lived the longest was to inherit the whole; this is seen by some historians as leaving the kingship of Wessex to the survivor, but other historians dispute this and it may have been intended to provide for the younger sons. Judith's status as both a Carolingian princess and a consecrated queen was so great that, rather than lose the prestige of her connections to Francia and to his father's reign, Æthelbald decided to marry her. The Anglo-Saxon Chronicle ignores the marriage, perhaps because mentioning such a prestigious connection of Alfred's older brother would have detracted from its focus on the achievements of Alfred himself. Æthelbald's marriage to his widowed stepmother was subsequently condemned by Asser as "against God's prohibition and Christian dignity, and also contrary to the practice of all pagans", although it does not appear to have aroused opposition at the time. The Frankish Annals of St Bertin reported the marriage without comment, and stated that when she returned to her father after Æthelbald's death, Judith was treated "with all the honour due to a queen". To her father's fury, soon afterwards she eloped with Baldwin, Count of Flanders, and their son Baldwin II married Alfred's daughter Ælfthryth.

Little is known of Æthelbald's reign and only two of his charters survive. S 1274, dated 858, (Note: The authenticity of charter S 1274 is disputed. Janet Nelson describes it as "untrustworthy" and David Dumville as "suspicious", but its genuineness is defended in detail by Simon Keynes.) is a grant by Swithun of an episcopal estate at Farnham to the king for his lifetime, and in Barbara Yorke's view it is an example of Æthelbald's confiscations of the bishop of Winchester's estates for his own use. S 326, dated 860, is a grant by Æthelbald of fourteen hides at Teffont in Wiltshire to a thegn called Osmund. Both are attested by Judith, an indication of her high status, as ninth-century West Saxon kings' wives were not normally given the rank of queen and almost never witnessed charters. The marriage and attestations are evidence that Æthelbald intended the succession to pass to his own son, not his brothers. (Note: In S 326 Judith is styled filius regis (king's son) due to a copyist's error.) S 326 is also attested by King Æthelberht, suggesting that he was on good terms with his brother. S 1274 is the earliest surviving West Saxon charter to require a contribution to fortification work, and Nelson suggests that Judith's entourage may have been responsible for the innovation. A few years later Charles the Bald began a programme of rebuilding town walls and building new fortresses in West Francia.

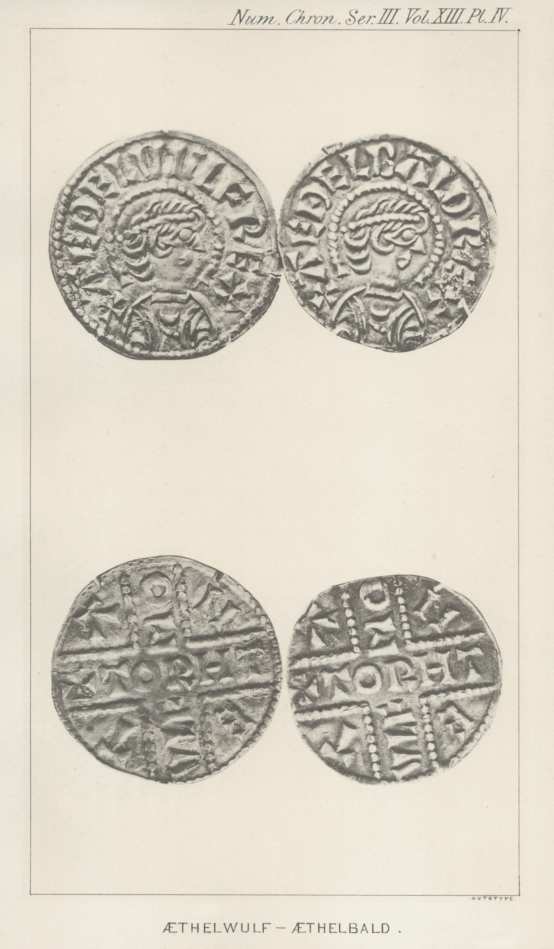
Fake coins of Æthelwulf and Æthelbald

No coins are known to have been issued in the name of Æthelbald. The main mints in southern England were both in Kent, at Canterbury and Rochester. They minted coins in the name of Æthelwulf until 858 and then in the name of Æthelberht. There was one mint in Wessex, probably at Southampton or Winchester, but it operated at a minimal level in the mid-ninth century and only three coins from it between 839 and 871 are known, two of Æthelwulf and one of Æthelred I, all produced by the same moneyer. The fact that the Kentish mints produced coins only for Æthelberht between 858 and 860 is evidence that Æthelbald was not his brother's overlord. Three coins of Æthelbald were regarded as genuine in the late nineteenth century, but in the 1900s they were found to be forgeries.

=== Death ===
Æthelbald died in 860 and the Anglo-Saxon Chronicle gives him a reign of five years, dating the start to 855 when Æthelwulf left for Rome. Both Asser and the Annals of St Neots give Æthelbald a rule of two and a half years, and the Annals adds that he also ruled for two and a half years jointly with his father. Most modern historians date his reign as 855 to 860, but some as 858 to 860. Only the year of his death is known, but as his father died in January 858 and he ruled for two and a half years thereafter, he probably died in about July 860. He was buried at Sherborne in Dorset and he is not known to have had any children.

He was succeeded by Æthelberht, who re-united Wessex and Kent under his rule. It is not clear whether the division between Wessex and Kent had been intended to be permanent, but if so Æthelbald's early death allowed Æthelberht to reverse the division, and Kent and the south-east were thereafter treated as an integral part of Wessex.

== Reputation ==
In the 890s, Bishop Asser gave the only surviving contemporary assessment of Æthelbald. Asser, who was hostile to him both because of his revolt against his father and because of his uncanonical marriage, described him as "iniquitous and grasping" and his reign as "two and a half lawless years", adding that many people attributed the rebellion "solely to arrogance on the part of King Æthelbald because he was grasping in this affair and many other wrongdoings". Post-Conquest clerical chroniclers adopted Asser's views. William of Malmesbury wrote that "Æthelbald, who was worthless and disloyal to his father, defiled his father's marriage-bed, for after his father's death he sank so low as to marry his stepmother Judith." According to John of Worcester, "Æthelbald, in defiance of God's prohibition and Christian dignity, and even against all pagan customs, climbed into his father's marriage-bed, married Judith, daughter of Charles, king of the Franks, and held the government of the kingdom of the West Saxons without restraint for two and half years after his father's death". Roger of Wendover condemned Æthelbald in similar terms, but claimed that in 859 he repented of his error, put aside Judith and ruled thereafter "in peace and righteousness". The exception was Henry of Huntingdon, who stated that Æthelbald and Æthelberht, "young men of superlative natural quality, possessed their kingdoms very prosperously as long as they each lived. When Æthelbald, King of Wessex, had held his kingdom peacefully for five years, he was carried off by a premature death. All England lamented King Æthelbald's youth and there was great sorrow over him. And they buried him at Sherborne. After this England was conscious of what it had lost in him."

Robert Howard Hodgkin also adopted Asser's views in his 1935 History of the Anglo-Saxons, but later historians have been more circumspect. Frank Stenton in Anglo-Saxon England does not give any opinion on Æthelbald, and observes that his marriage to Judith does not appear to have aroused any scandal among the churchmen of her country, while Sean Miller in his Dictionary of National Biography article on Æthelbald says that very little is known of his reign after his marriage, but he appears to have been on good terms with Æthelberht.

== Sources ==
- Abels, Richard (1998). Alfred the Great: War, Kingship and Culture in Anglo-Saxon England. Harlow, UK: Longman. ISBN 978-0-582-04047-2.
- Abels, Richard (2002). "Royal Succession and the Growth of Political Stability in Ninth-Century Wessex". The Haskins Society Journal: Studies in Medieval History. 12: 83–97. ISBN 978-1-84383-008-5.
- Brooks, Nicholas (1971). "The Development of Military Obligations in Eighth- and Ninth-Century England". In Clemoes, Peter; Hughes, Kathleen (eds.). England Before the Conquest: Studies in Primary Sources Presented to Dorothy Whitelock. Cambridge, UK: Cambridge University Press. pp. 69–84. ISBN 978-0-521-08191-7.
- Charles-Edwards, T. M. (2013). Wales and the Britons 350–1064. Oxford, UK: Oxford University Press. ISBN 978-0-19-821731-2.
- Darlington, R. R.; McGurk, P.; Bray, Jennifer, eds. (1995). The Chronicle of John of Worcester. Vol. 2. Oxford, UK: Clarendon Press. ISBN 978-0-19-822261-3.
- Dumville, David (1979). "The Ætheling, a Study in Anglo-Saxon constitutional history". Anglo-Saxon England. 8: 1–33. doi:10.1017/S026367510000301X. ISSN 0263-6751. S2CID 159954001.
- Dumville, David (1992). Wessex and England from Alfred to Edgar: Six Essays on Political, Cultural, and Ecclesiastical Revival. Woodbridge, UK: Boydell Press. ISBN 978-0-85115-308-7.
- Dumville, David (1996). "The Local Rulers of Anglo-Saxon England to 927". In Fryde, E. B.; Greenway, D. E.; Porter, S.; Roy, I (eds.). Handbook of British Chronology (3rd with corrections ed.). Cambridge, UK: Cambridge University Press. pp. 1–25. ISBN 0-521-56350-X.
- Edwards, Heather (2004). "Ecgberht [Egbert] (d. 839), king of the West Saxons". Oxford Dictionary of National Biography. Oxford University Press. doi:10.1093/ref:odnb/8581. (subscription, Wikipedia Library access or UK public library membership required)
- Enright, Michael J. (1979). "Charles the Bald and Æthelwulf of Wessex: Alliance of 856 and Strategies of Royal Succession". Journal of Medieval History. 5 (1): 291–302. doi:10.1016/0304-4181(79)90003-4. ISSN 0304-4181.
- Firth, Matthew (2024). Early English Queens, 850-1000: Potestas Reginae. London: Routledge. doi:10.4324/9781003165453. ISBN 978-0-3677-6093-9.
- Giles, J. A., ed. (1849). Roger of Wendover's Flowers of History. Vol. 1. London: Henry G. Bohn. OCLC 633664910.
- Greenway, Diana, ed. (1996). Henry, Archdeacon of Huntingdon: Historia Anglorum. Oxford, UK: Clarendon Press. ISBN 978-0-19-822224-8.
- Grierson, Philip; Blackburn, Mark (1986). Medieval European Coinage. Cambridge, UK: Cambridge University Press. ISBN 0-521-26009-4.
- Hodgkin, R. H. (1935). A History of the Anglo-Saxons. Vol. 2. Oxford, UK: Clarendon Press. OCLC 459347986.
- Keynes, Simon; Lapidge, Michael, eds. (1983). Alfred the Great: Asser's Life of King Alfred & Other Contemporary Sources. London: Penguin Classics. ISBN 978-0-14-044409-4.
- Keynes, Simon (November 1994). "The West Saxon Charters of King Æthelwulf and his sons". English Historical Review. 109 (434): 1109–1149. doi:10.1093/ehr/cix.434.1109. ISSN 0013-8266.
- Keynes, Simon (1995). "England, 700–900". In McKitterick, Rosamond (ed.). The New Cambridge Medieval History. Vol. II. Cambridge University Press. pp. 18–42. ISBN 978-0-521-36292-4.
- Keynes, Simon (1998). An Atlas of Attestations in Anglo-Saxon Charters, c. 670–1066. Cambridge: Dept. of Anglo-Saxon, Norse, and Celtic, University of Cambridge. OCLC 41975443.
- Kirby, D. P. (2000). The Earliest English Kings (Revised ed.). London: Routledge. ISBN 978-0-415-24211-0.
- Lawrence, L. A. (1893). "Coinage of Aethelbald". The Numismatic Chronicle and Journal of the Numismatic Society. 3rd. 13: 40–45. ISSN 2054-9172.
- Lawrence, L. A. (1905). "Forgery in Relation to Numismatics". British Numismatic Journal. 2: 397–409. OCLC 1537348.
- Miller, Sean, ed. (2001). Charters of the New Minster, Winchester. Oxford, UK: Oxford University Press. ISBN 978-0-19-726223-8.
- Miller, Sean (2004). "Æthelbald (d. 860), king of the West Saxons". Oxford Dictionary of National Biography. Oxford University Press. doi:10.1093/ref:odnb/8901. (subscription, Wikipedia Library access or UK public library membership required)
- Mynors, R. A. B.; Thomson, R. M.; Winterbottom, M., eds. (1998). William of Malmesbury: Gesta Regum Anglorum, The History of the English Kings. Oxford, UK: Clarendon Press. ISBN 978-0-19-820678-1.
- Naismith, Rory (2011). The Coinage of Southern England 796–865. Vol. 1. London: Spink & Son. ISBN 978-1-907427-09-1.
- Naismith, Rory (2012). Money and Power in Anglo-Saxon England: The Southern English Kingdoms, 757–965. Cambridge, UK: Cambridge University Press. ISBN 978-1-107-66969-7.
- Nelson, Janet (1991a). "Reconstructing a Royal Family: Reflections on Alfred from Asser, Chapter 2". In Wood, Ian; Lund, Niels (eds.). People and places in Northern Europe 500–1600 : Essays in Honour of Peter Hayes Sawyer. Woodbridge, UK: Boydell Press. pp. 48–66. ISBN 978-0-851-15547-0.
- Nelson, Janet (1991b). The Annals of St-Bertin. Manchester, UK: Manchester University Press. ISBN 978-0-7190-3426-8.
- Nelson, Janet L. (1997). "The Franks and the English in the Ninth Century Reconsidered" (PDF). In Szarmach, Paul E.; Rosenthal, Joel T. (eds.). The Preservation and Transmission of Anglo-Saxon Culture: Selected Papers from the 1991 Meeting of the International Society of Anglo-Saxonists. Kalamazoo, Michigan: Medieval Institute Publications, Western Michigan University. pp. 141–158. ISBN 978-1-879288-90-4. Archived (PDF) from the original on 3 January 2017.
- Nelson, Janet (2003). "Alfred's Carolingian Contemporaries". In Reuter, Timothy (ed.). Alfred the Great. Aldershot, UK: Ashgate. pp. 293–310. ISBN 978-0-7546-0957-5.
- Nelson, Janet L. (2004). "Æthelwulf (d. 858), king of the West Saxons". Oxford Dictionary of National Biography. Oxford University Press. doi:10.1093/ref:odnb/8921. (subscription, Wikipedia Library access or UK public library membership required)
- Nelson, Janet L. (2013). "Britain, Ireland and Europe, c. 750–c. 900". In Stafford, Pauline (ed.). A Companion to the Early Middle Ages: Britain and Ireland c. 500–c. 1100. Chichester, UK: Wiley Blackwell. pp. 231–247. ISBN 978-1-4051-0628-3.
- Smyth, Alfred P. (1995). King Alfred the Great. Oxford, UK: Oxford University Press. ISBN 978-0-19-822989-6.
- Stafford, Pauline (1981). "Charles the Bald, Judith and England". In Gibson, Margaret; Nelson, Janet L. (eds.). Charles the Bald: Court and Kingdom. Oxford, UK: B A R. pp. 137–51. ISBN 978-0-86054-115-8.
- Stafford, Pauline (2001). Queen Emma and Queen Edith. Oxford, UK: Blackwell. ISBN 978-0-631-16679-5.
- Stafford, Pauline (2003). "Succession and Inheritance: a Gendered Perspective on Alfred's Family History". In Reuter, Timothy (ed.). Alfred the Great. Aldershot, UK: Ashgate. pp. 251–264. ISBN 978-1-138-24830-4.
- Stenton, Frank M. (1971). Anglo-Saxon England (3rd ed.). Oxford, UK: Oxford University Press. ISBN 978-0-19-280139-5.
- Williams, Ann (1991). "Æthelbald king of Wessex 855–860". In Williams, Ann; Smyth, Alfred P.; Kirby, D. P. (eds.). A Biographical Dictionary of Dark Age Britain. London: Seaby. p. 18. ISBN 1-85264-047-2.
- Williams, Ann (1999). Kingship and Government in Pre-Conquest England, c. 500–1066. Basingstoke, UK: Macmillan Press. ISBN 978-0-333-56798-2.
- Yorke, Barbara (1984). "The Bishops of Winchester, the Kings of Wessex and the Development of Winchester in the Ninth and Early Tenth Centuries". Proceedings of the Hampshire Field Club and Archaeological Society. 40: 61–70. ISSN 0142-8950.
- Yorke, Barbara (1995). Wessex in the Early Middle Ages. London: Leicester University Press. ISBN 978-0-7185-1856-1.

Preceded by Æthelwulf	King of Wessex; 855–860	Succeeded by Æthelberht
