= Æthelberht, King of Wessex =

King of Wessex from 860 to 865

Æthelberht
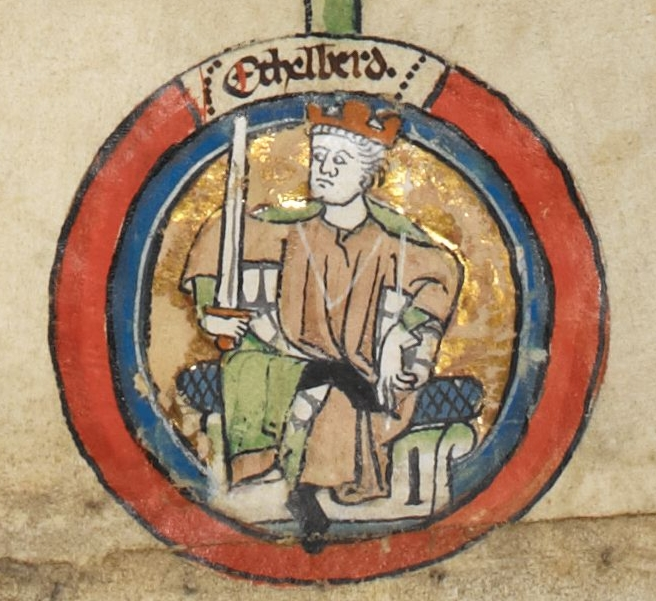
- Æthelberht in the early fourteenth-century Genealogical Roll of the Kings of England

King of Wessex
- Reign: 860–865
- Predecessor: Æthelbald
- Successor: Æthelred I
- Died: Autumn 865
- Burial: Sherborne Abbey
- House: Wessex
- Father: Æthelwulf
- Mother: Osburh

Æthelberht (Old English: [ˈæðelberˠxt]; also spelled Ethelbert or Aethelberht) was the King of Wessex from 860 until his death in 865. He was the third son of King Æthelwulf by his first wife, Osburh. Æthelberht was first recorded as a witness to a charter in 854. The following year Æthelwulf went on pilgrimage to Rome and appointed his oldest surviving son, Æthelbald, as king of Wessex while Æthelberht became king of the recently conquered territory of Kent. Æthelberht may have surrendered his position to his father when he returned from pilgrimage but resumed (or kept) the south-eastern kingship when his father died in 858.

When Æthelbald died in 860, Æthelberht united both their territories under his rule. He did not appoint a sub-king and Wessex and Kent were fully united for the first time. He appears to have been on good terms with his younger brothers, the future kings Æthelred I and Alfred the Great. The kingdom came under attack from Viking raids during his reign, but these were minor compared with the invasions after his death. Æthelberht died in the autumn of 865 and was buried next to his brother Æthelbald at Sherborne Abbey in Dorset. He was succeeded by Æthelred.

== Background ==
When Æthelberht's grandfather Ecgberht became king of Wessex in 802, in the view of the historian Richard Abels, it must have seemed very unlikely to contemporaries that he would establish a lasting dynasty. For two hundred years, three families had fought for the West Saxon throne, and no son had followed his father as king. Ecgberht's nearest connection to a previous king of Wessex was as a great-great-grandson of Ingild, brother of King Ine (688–726), but he was believed to be a paternal descendant of Cerdic, the founder of the West Saxon dynasty. This made Ecgberht an ætheling – a prince who had a legitimate claim to the throne. But in the ninth and tenth centuries, descent from Cerdic was no longer sufficient to make a man an ætheling: Ecgberht's line controlled the kingdom and all kings were sons of kings.

At the beginning of the ninth century, England was almost wholly under the control of the Anglo-Saxons. The Midland kingdom of Mercia dominated southern England, but their supremacy came to an end in 825 when they were decisively defeated by Ecgberht at the Battle of Ellendun. The two kingdoms became allies, which was important in the resistance to Viking attacks. In the same year Ecgberht sent his son Æthelwulf to conquer the Mercian sub-kingdom of Kent (the area of the modern county plus Essex, Surrey and Sussex) and appointed him sub-king. In 835 the Isle of Sheppey was ravaged by Vikings and in the following year they defeated Ecgberht at Carhampton in Somerset, but in 838 he was victorious over an alliance of Cornishmen and Vikings at the Battle of Hingston Down, reducing Cornwall to the status of a client kingdom. He died in 839 and was succeeded by Æthelwulf, who appointed his eldest son Æthelstan as sub-king of Kent. Æthelwulf and Ecgberht may not have intended a permanent union between Wessex and Kent as they both appointed sons as sub-kings and charters in Wessex were attested (witnessed) by West Saxon magnates, while Kentish charters were witnessed by the Kentish elite; both kings kept overall control and the sub-kings were not allowed to issue their own coinage.

Viking raids increased in the early 840s on both sides of the English Channel, and in 843 Æthelwulf was defeated by the companies of 35 Danish ships at Carhampton. In 850 Æthelstan defeated a Danish fleet off Sandwich in the first recorded naval battle in English history. In 851 Æthelwulf and his second son Æthelbald defeated the Vikings at the Battle of Aclea and, according to the Anglo-Saxon Chronicle, "there made the greatest slaughter of a heathen raiding-army that we have heard tell of up to this present day, and there took the victory".

== Sources ==
Anglo-Saxon charters provide the major source for Æthelberht's life and narrative accounts are very limited. The Anglo-Saxon Chronicle only mentions two events in his reign and these are also the only incidents related in Asser's biography of his younger brother Alfred the Great, which is mainly based on the Chronicle for the mid-tenth century.

== Family ==
Æthelberht was the third of five sons of Æthelwulf and his first wife Osburh, who died around 855. (Note: Most historians describe Osburh as the mother of all Æthelwulf's children, but some scholars have argued that in view of the large age gap between older and younger ones, Osburh may only have been the mother of Æthelred and Alfred, while Æthelberht and his older brothers were born to an unrecorded earlier wife.) Æthelstan died in the early 850s, but the four younger brothers were successively kings of Wessex: Æthelbald from 855 to 860, (Note: The Anglo-Saxon Chronicle states that Æthelbald ruled for five years until his death in 860, implying that he was joint or sub-king with his father from 855 until Æthelwulf died in 858. Historians often date Æthelbald's reign from 855, but some date it from 858.) Æthelberht from 860 to 865, Æthelred I from 865 to 871 and Alfred the Great from 871 to 899. Æthelberht had one sister, Æthelswith, who married King Burgred of Mercia in 853.

== Early life ==
Æthelberht was first recorded when he attested charters in 854. In the following year Æthelwulf went on pilgrimage to Rome after appointing his eldest surviving son, Æthelbald, under-king of Wessex and Æthelberht under-king of Kent, Essex, Sussex and Surrey, appointments which suggest that his sons were to succeed to the separate kingdoms whether or not he returned to England. Æthelberht attested charters as dux (ealdorman) in 854 and king in 855. In 856, Æthelwulf returned to England with a new wife, Judith, daughter of Charles the Bald, king of the West Franks. Æthelbald, with the support of Eahlstan, Bishop of Sherborne, and Eanwulf, Ealdorman of Somerset, refused to give up his kingship of Wessex. Æthelwulf compromised to avoid a civil war, but historians disagree on how the kingdom was divided. According to Asser, Æthelwulf was assigned the "eastern districts", and most historians assume that Æthelbald kept Wessex while Æthelberht gave up Kent to his father; some others believe that Wessex itself was divided, with Æthelbald ruling the west and Æthelwulf the east, and Æthelberht retaining Kent.

Charter S 331, which survives in its original form, dated 862. King Æthelberht granted land at Bromley in Kent to his minister Dryhtwald.

Æthelwulf confirmed that he intended a permanent division of his kingdom as he recommended that on his death Æthelbald should be king of Wessex and Æthelberht king of Kent. This proposal was carried out when Æthelwulf died in 858. According to the Anglo-Saxon Chronicle: "And then Æthelwulf's two sons succeeded to the kingdom: Æthelbald to the kingdom of Wessex, and Æthelberht to the kingdom of the inhabitants of Kent and to the kingdom of Essex and to Surrey and to the kingdom of Sussex". Æthelbald was later condemned by Alfred the Great's biographer, Asser, both for his rebellion against his father and because he married his father's widow, but he appears to have been on good terms with Æthelberht. In 858 Æthelbald issued a charter (S 1274) relating to land in Surrey, and thus in his brother's territory, and a charter he issued in 860 (S 326) was witnessed by Æthelberht and Judith.

Æthelberht appears to have made significant changes in personnel as a Kentish charter of 858 (S 328) was witnessed by twenty-one thegns, out of whom fourteen did not witness a surviving charter of his father. They include Eastmund, who Æthelberht later appointed ealdorman of Kent. The charter is regarded by historians as important because it clarifies the obligations of folkland. (Note: Folkland, which was passed on a holder's death by customary rules, was distinguished from bookland which could be left by will. S 328 showed that the king could draw food rents and customary services from folkland.)

== Reign ==
The separation of Wessex and Kent was soon reversed as Æthelbald died childless in 860 and Æthelberht succeeded to the whole kingdom of Wessex and Kent. Æthelred and Alfred may have been intended to succeed in Wessex, but they were too young as the preference was for adults as kings, especially when Wessex was under threat from the Vikings. During Æthelberht's rule over the whole kingdom, Wessex and its recent south-eastern conquests became a united kingdom for the first time. Unlike his father and grandfather, Æthelberht did not appoint another member of his family as under-king of Kent. A Kentish charter issued in the first year of his reign (S 327) was the first to include a full complement both of West Saxon and Kentish attesters, although he then returned to locally attested charters.

The historian Simon Keynes sees this charter as:

a highly significant development. It is exceptional in naming not only the Archbishop of Canterbury and the Bishop of Rochester (which is all that we might have been led to expect in a Kentish charter), but also the bishops of Sherborne, Winchester, Selsey and (most remarkably) London; (Note: Selsey in Sussex was part of greater Wessex, but London was then a Mercian town.) it is also exceptional in carrying the attestations of no fewer than ten ealdormen, from both the western and eastern parts of the kingdom. When placed in the context of other ninth-century West Saxon charters, this charter seems to reflect an assembly of a kind not previously seen and a kind of assembly which itself reflected the new arrangements for the unification of Wessex and the south-east.

According to the Anglo-Saxon Chronicle, Æthelberht reigned "in good harmony and in great peace" and "in peace, love and honour". He appears to have been on good terms with his younger brothers and in a charter of 861 (S 330), he granted land to St Augustine's, Canterbury, in return for the abbot's continuing loyalty to him, Æthelred, and Alfred. Some historians believe that the three brothers agreed that each would succeed to the throne in turn. In two charters in 862 and 863 (S 335 and S 336), Æthelred makes grants as king of the West Saxons and Æthelberht is not mentioned. In Keynes's view, Æthelberht may have delegated some power in Wessex, perhaps in his own absence. However, a charter of Æthelberht dated December 863 (S 333) is attested by Æthelred and Alfred as filius regis (king's son). Æthelberht granted immunity from royal and judicial services to Sherborne church in honour of the souls of his father Æthelwulf and his brother Æthelbald. Unlike most charters, which were in Latin, this one is in Old English, and historians disagree whether this reflects a trend towards greater use of the vernacular as better suited to recording legal documents or support for Alfred's later claim that knowledge of Latin had declined disastrously when he came to the throne in 871.

Æthelberht's reign began and ended with raids by the Vikings. In 860, a Viking army sailed from the Somme to England and sacked Winchester, but they were then defeated by the men of Hampshire and Berkshire. Probably in the autumn of 864, another Viking army camped on Thanet and were promised money in return for peace, but they broke their promise and ravaged eastern Kent. These attacks were minor compared with events after Æthelberht's death, when the Vikings almost conquered England.

== Coinage ==
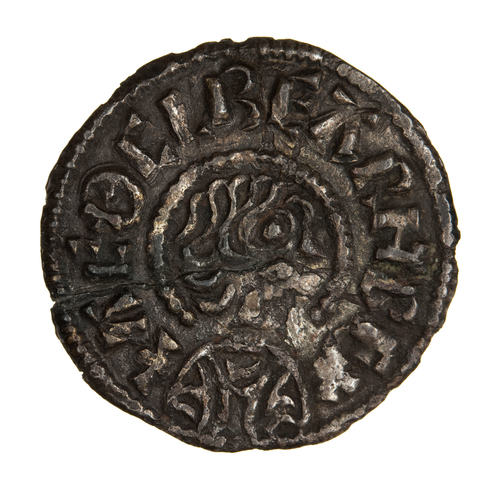
Coin of King Æthelberht dated c. 862

In the late eighth and ninth centuries, the only denomination of coin produced in southern England was the silver penny. Coins were minted in an unidentified town in Wessex itself, but activity in the mid-ninth century was minimal and no Wessex coins of Æthelberht are known. Kent had mints at Canterbury and Rochester and they produced coins in the name of Æthelwulf until 858 and Æthelberht thereafter. The lack of coins in the name of Æthelbald is evidence that he did not have any status of overlordship over Æthelberht. In the early ninth century the quality of the inscription and the bust of the king on coins declined, but it revived on the Inscribed Cross penny at the end of Æthelwulf's reign and this continued under Æthelberht's, which also saw the introduction of the rare Floreate Cross design in about 862. There was a considerable increase in the number of moneyers: twelve struck Inscribed Cross coins in Æthelwulf's reign and fifty in Æthelberht's. This may have been due to a recoinage starting at the end of Æthelwulf's reign and continuing in Æthelberht's, when old coins were called in and melted down to make new ones. The silver content of his Inscribed Cross issue fell to below 50% and one penny minted in Canterbury has only 30%, but a Floreate Cross coin has 84%, perhaps indicating that it was intended as a recoinage with higher fineness. There was also increasing standardisation of design in the coinage, reflecting greater royal control over currency and minting in the middle of the ninth century.

== Death and reputation ==
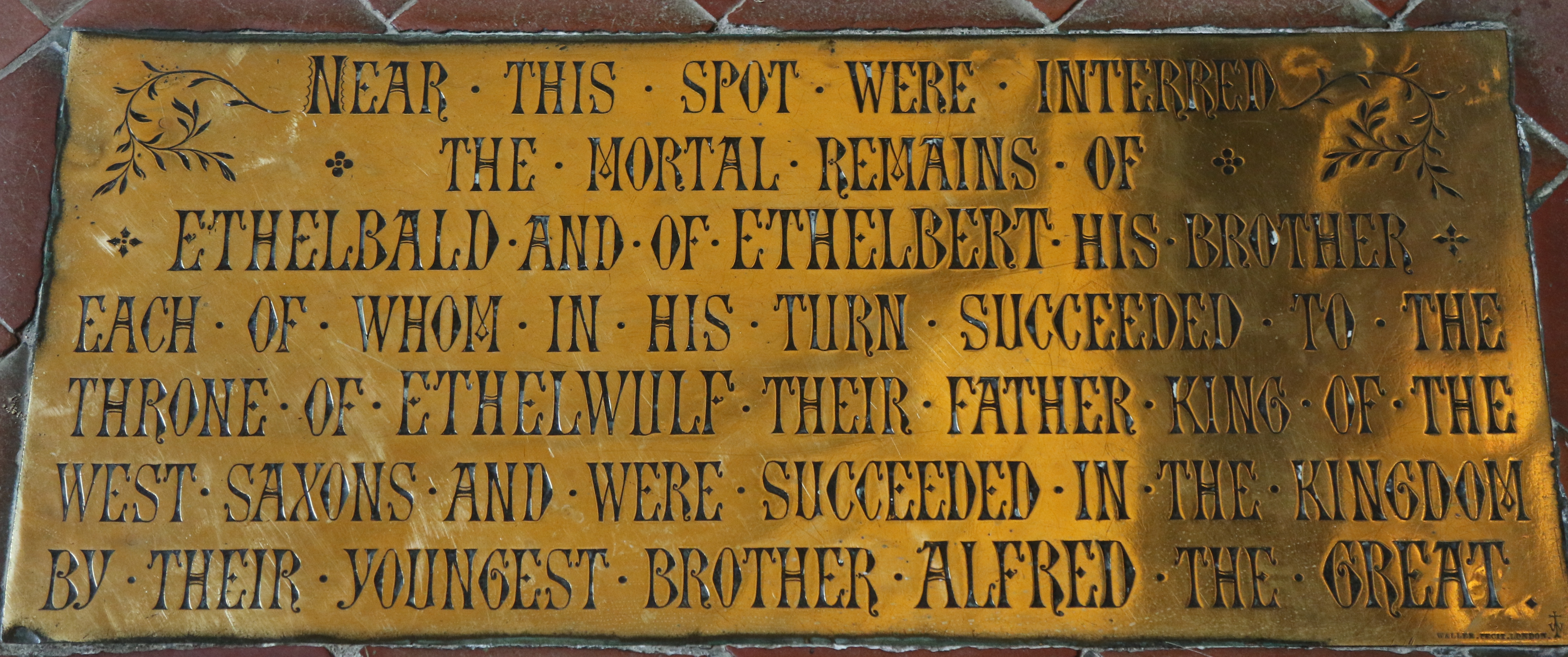
Memorial to Æthelbald ("ETHELBALD") and Æthelberht ("ETHELBERT") in Sherborne Abbey

Æthelberht died of unknown causes in the autumn of 865. He was buried at Sherborne Abbey in Dorset beside his brother Æthelbald but the tombs had been lost by the sixteenth century. He had no known children (Note: It is possible that Æthelberht had a son called Oswald or Osweald, who attested two charters in 868 and one in 875 as filius regis (king's son). It is not known who his father was and it could have been Æthelberht.) and was succeeded by his brother Æthelred.

According to Asser, who based his account of events before 887 mainly on the Anglo-Saxon Chronicle: "So after governing in peace, love and honour for five years, Æthelberht went the way of all flesh, to the great sorrow of his people; and he lies buried honourably beside his brother, at Sherborne." Asser's view was followed by post-Conquest historians. John of Worcester copied Asser's words, while William of Malmesbury described him as "a vigorous but kindly ruler". The 20th-century historian Alfred Smyth points out that the Anglo-Saxon Chronicle, which was first written in Alfred the Great's reign, only recorded two events in Æthelberht's reign, the attacks on Winchester and eastern Kent, and does not associate the king personally with either of them. Smyth argues that this reflected an agenda by Alfred's propagandists to play down the achievements of his brothers to enhance the reputation of Alfred himself.

== Sources ==
- Abels, Richard (1998). Alfred the Great: War, Kingship and Culture in Anglo-Saxon England. Harlow, UK: Longman. ISBN 978-0-582-04047-2.
- Abels, Richard (2002). "Royal Succession and the Growth of Political Stability in Ninth-Century Wessex". The Haskins Society Journal: Studies in Medieval History. 12: 83–97. ISBN 978-1-84383-008-5.
- Campbell, A., ed. (1973). Charters of Rochester. London: Oxford University Press. ISBN 978-0-19-725936-8.
- Charles-Edwards, T. M. (2013). Wales and the Britons 350–1064. Oxford: Oxford University Press. ISBN 978-0-19-821731-2.
- Darlington, R. R.; McGurk, P.; Bray, Jennifer, eds. (1995). The Chronicle of John of Worcester. Vol. 2. Oxford: Clarendon Press. ISBN 978-0-19-822261-3.
- Dumville, David (1979). "The Ætheling, a Study in Anglo-Saxon constitutional history". Anglo-Saxon England. 8: 1–33. doi:10.1017/S026367510000301X. ISSN 0263-6751. S2CID 159954001.
- Foot, Sarah (2011). Æthelstan: The First King of England. Yale University Press. ISBN 978-0-300-12535-1.
- Grierson, Philip; Blackburn, Mark (2005). Medieval European Coinage: Volume 1, The Early Middle Ages (5th–10th Centuries). Cambridge: Cambridge University Press. ISBN 978-0-5212-6009-1.
- Huscroft, Richard (2019). Making England, 796–1042. Abingdon: Routledge. ISBN 978-1-138-18246-2.
- Keynes, Simon; Lapidge, Michael, eds. (1983). Alfred the Great: Asser's Life of King Alfred & Other Contemporary Sources. London: Penguin Classics. ISBN 978-0-14-044409-4.
- Keynes, Simon (1993). "The Control of Kent in the Ninth Century". Early Medieval Europe. 2 (2): 111–31. doi:10.1111/j.1468-0254.1993.tb00013.x. ISSN 1468-0254.
- Keynes, Simon (November 1994). "The West Saxon Charters of King Æthelwulf and his sons". English Historical Review. 109 (434): 1109–49. doi:10.1093/ehr/cix.434.1109. ISSN 0013-8266.
- Keynes, Simon (1995). "England, 700–900". In McKitterick, Rosamond (ed.). The New Cambridge Medieval History. Vol. II. Cambridge University Press. pp. 18–42. ISBN 978-0-521-36292-4.
- Kirby, D. H. (2000). The Earliest English Kings (Revised ed.). London: Routledge. ISBN 978-0-415-24211-0.
- Miller, Sean (2004a). "Æthelbald (d. 860), king of the West Saxons". Oxford Dictionary of National Biography. Oxford University Press. doi:10.1093/ref:odnb/8901. (subscription, Wikipedia Library access or UK public library membership required)
- Miller, Sean (2004b). "Æthelberht (d. 865)". Oxford Dictionary of National Biography. Oxford University Press. doi:10.1093/ref:odnb/8904. ISBN 978-0-19-861412-8. (subscription, Wikipedia Library access or UK public library membership required)
- Mynors, R. A. B.; Thomson, R. M.; Winterbottom, M., eds. (1998). William of Malmesbury: Gesta Regum Anglorum, The History of the English Kings. Oxford: Clarendon Press. ISBN 978-0-19-820678-1.
- Naismith, Rory (2012). Money and Power in Anglo-Saxon England: The Southern English Kingdoms, 757–965. Cambridge: Cambridge University Press. ISBN 978-1-107-66969-7.
- Nelson, Janet L. (2004). "Æthelwulf (d. 858), king of the West Saxons". Oxford Dictionary of National Biography. Oxford University Press. doi:10.1093/ref:odnb/8921. (subscription, Wikipedia Library access or UK public library membership required)
- Pagan, Hugh (1986). "Coinage in Southern England, 796–874". In Blackburn, M. A. S. (ed.). Anglo-Saxon Monetary History. Leicester: Leicester University Press. pp. 45–65. ISBN 978-0-7185-1239-2.
- Page, William, ed. (1908). "Houses of Benedictine monks: The Abbey of Sherborne". A History of the County of Dorset. Victoria County History. Vol. 2. London, UK: Archibald Constable. pp. 62–70. OCLC 651964034.
- Robertson, A. J., ed. (1939). Anglo-Saxon Charters. Cambridge: Cambridge University Press. OCLC 187104199.
- Smyth, Alfred P. (1995). King Alfred the Great. Oxford: Oxford University Press. ISBN 978-0-19-822989-6.
- Stafford, Pauline (2001). Queen Emma and Queen Edith. Oxford: Blackwell. ISBN 978-0-631-16679-5.
- Stenton, Frank M. (1971). Anglo-Saxon England (3rd ed.). Oxford: Oxford University Press. ISBN 978-0-19-280139-5.
- Swanton, Michael, ed. (2000). The Anglo-Saxon Chronicles. London: Phoenix. ISBN 978-1-84212-003-3.
- Williams, Ann (1979). "Some Notes and Considerations Connected with the English Royal Succession, 860–1066". Proceeding of the Battle Conference on Anglo-Norman Studies. 1: 144–233. ISBN 978-0-85115-107-6.
- Yorke, Barbara (1995). Wessex in the Early Middle Ages. London: Leicester University Press. ISBN 978-0-7185-1856-1.

Regnal titles
Preceded by Æthelbald	King of Wessex; 860–865	Succeeded by Æthelred
