= Battle of Sandwich (851) =

- Part of the Viking invasions of England
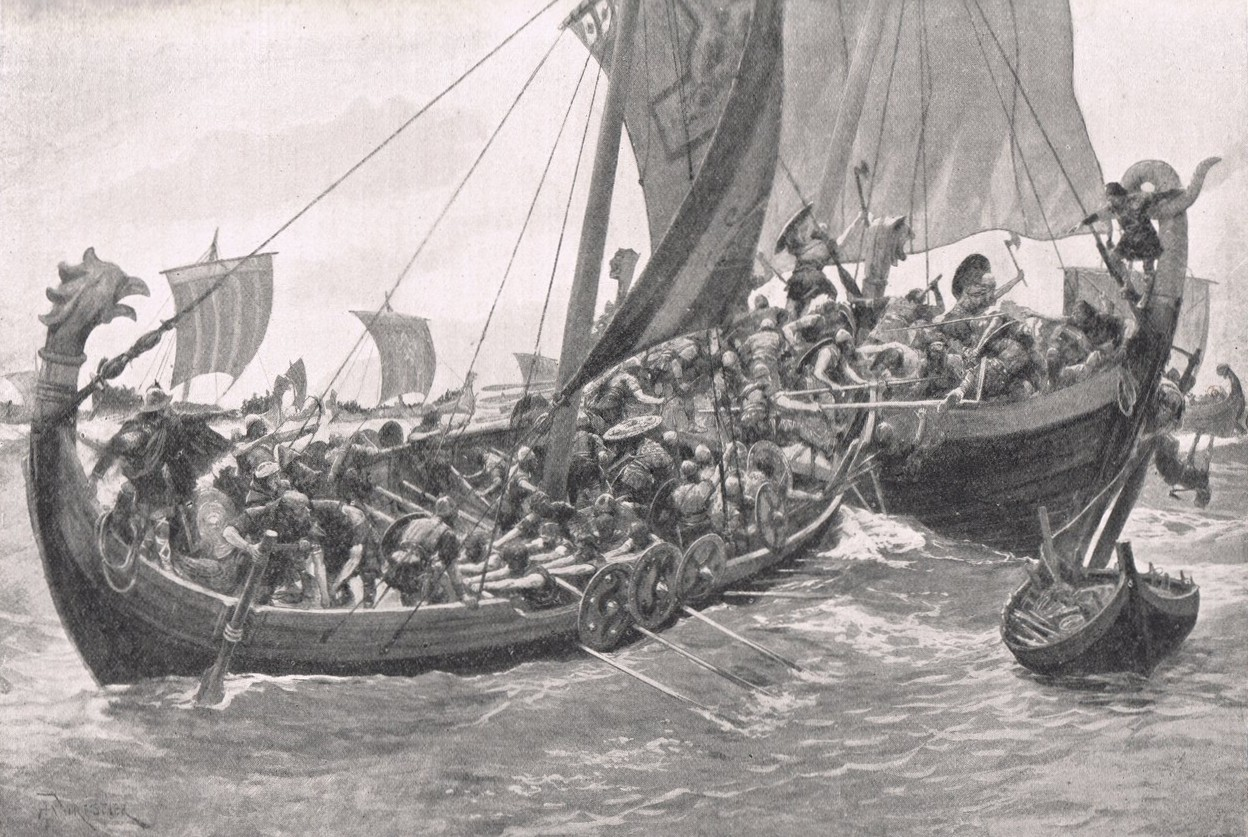
- Painting of the battle by Amédée Forestier
Date	851
Location	Sandwich, England
Result	Kentish victory

Belligerents
Kentishmen	Danish Vikings

Commanders and leaders
Æthelstan	Unknown

Strength
Unknown	More than nine ships

Casualties and losses
Unknown	Nine ships lost

The Battle of Sandwich in 851 was the first known naval battle in English history. It was a Kentish victory against a Danish Viking fleet.

In 851 King Æthelwulf of Wessex scored a major victory at the battle of Aclea over an army drawn from 350 Danish ships. He had appointed his eldest son Æthelstan under-king of Kent, and in the same year Æthelstan and his ealdorman Ealhhere defeated a Danish fleet off Sandwich in Kent.

The Anglo-Saxon Chronicle recorded under 851 that: "King Æthelstan and Ealdorman Ealhhere fought in ships, and slew a great army at Sandwich in Kent, and captured nine ships, and put the others to flight.
