= Osburh =

First wife and consort of King Æthelwulf of Wessex

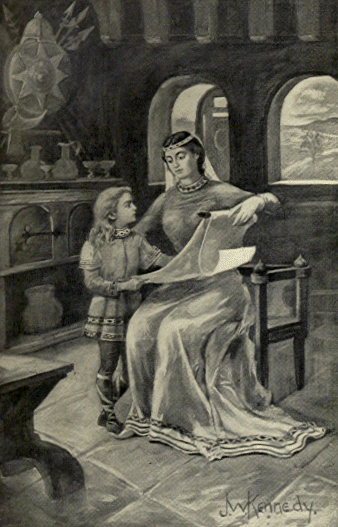
- Early 20th-century illustration of Osburh reading to her son Alfred
- Spouse: Æthelwulf, King of Wessex
- Issue: Æthelstan, King of Kent; Æthelswith, Queen of Mercia; Æthelbald, King of Wessex; Æthelberht, King of Wessex; Æthelred I, King of Wessex; Alfred, King of the Anglo-Saxons
- Father: Oslac

Osburh or Osburga (also Osburga Oslacsdotter) was the first wife of King Æthelwulf of Wessex and mother of King Alfred the Great. Alfred's biographer, Asser, described her as "a most religious woman, noble in character and noble by birth."

== Sources ==
Osburh's existence is known only from Asser's Life of King Alfred. She is not named as a witness to any charters, nor is her death reported in the Anglo-Saxon Chronicle. So far as is known, she was the mother of all Æthelwulf's children, his five sons Æthelstan, Æthelbald, Æthelberht, Æthelred and Alfred, and his daughter Æthelswith, wife of King Burgred of Mercia.

Osburh is best known from Asser's story about a book of Saxon songs she showed to her sons, offering to give the book to whoever could first memorise it, a challenge Alfred took up and won. This exhibits high-status ninth-century women's interest in books and their role in educating their children.

Osburh was the daughter of Oslac (who is also only known from Asser's Life), King Æthelwulf's pincerna (cupbearer), an important figure in the royal court and household. Oslac has partial Gothic ancestry and is a descendant of King Cerdic's Jutish nephews, Stuf and Wihtgar, who conquered and settled the Isle of Wight.

== See also ==
- House of Wessex family tree
