= Æthelstan of Kent =

King of Kent

Æthelstan (/ˈæθəlstæn/; died c. 852) was the King of Kent from 839 to 851. He served under the authority and overlordship of his father, King Æthelwulf of Wessex, who appointed him. The late D, E and F versions of the Anglo-Saxon Chronicle describe Æthelstan as Æthelwulf's brother, but the A, B and C versions, and Æthelweard's Chronicon, state that he was Æthelwulf's son. Some historians have argued that it is more probable that he was a brother, including Eric John in 1966 and Ann Williams in 1978. However, in 1991 Ann Williams described him as Æthelwulf's son, and this is now generally accepted by historians, including Frank Stenton, Barbara Yorke, and D. P. Kirby.

When Æthelwulf became King of the West Saxons in 839 on the death of his father, Ecgberht, he appointed Æthelstan to rule over Kent, Essex, Surrey and Sussex. He is styled king in the Anglo-Saxon Chronicle and Æthelweard's chronicle calls him "King of the Dwellers in Kent, of the East Saxons, of the South Saxons and of Surrey". He attested a number of his father's charters as king in the 840s.

In 851, Æthelstan and Ealdorman Ealhhere defeated a Viking fleet and army off Sandwich, Kent, described by Frank Stenton as "the first naval battle in recorded English history". Æthelstan is not mentioned after 851 and presumably died before Æthelwulf went to Rome in 855 as he was not included in arrangements for government of the kingdom during his father's absence. In 853, Ealhhere died in a disastrous defeat of the men of Kent and Surrey by the Vikings, and as Æthelstan is not mentioned as present at the battle he was probably dead by then.

A mid-ninth century burial found during excavations in the Old Minster, Winchester contained the body of a young man of 25–35. His headdress and the prestigious location of the burial in the nave suggests royal status, and the "strongest putative candidate" is Æthelstan.

== Sources ==
- John, Eric (1966). Orbis Britanniae. Leicester University Press.
- Keynes, Simon; Lapidge, Michael, eds. (1983). Alfred the Great: Asser's Life of King Alfred & Other Contemporary Sources. Penguin Classics. ISBN 978-0-14-044409-4.
- Kirby, D.P. (2000). The Earliest English Kings (Revised ed.). Routledge. ISBN 0-415-24211-8.
- Nelson, Janet L. (2004). "Æthelwulf (d. 858), king of the West Saxons". Oxford Dictionary of National Biography. Oxford University Press. doi:10.1093/ref:odnb/39264. (subscription, Wikipedia Library access or UK public library membership required)
- Smyth, Alfred P. (1995). King Alfred the Great. Oxford, UK: Oxford University Press. ISBN 0-19-822989-5.
- Stenton, Frank (1971). Anglo-Saxon England (3rd ed.). Oxford University Press. ISBN 978-0-19-280139-5.
- Williams, Ann (1979). Brown, R. Allen (ed.). "Some notes and considerations on problems connected with the English royal succession 860-1066". Proceedings of the Battle Conference on Anglo-Norman Studies. The Boydell Press. ISBN 0-85115-107-8.
- Williams, Ann (1991). "Athelstan king of Kent d. c. 852". In Williams, Ann; Smyth, Alfred P.; Kirby, D. P. (eds.). A Biographical Dictionary of Dark Age Britain. Seaby. ISBN 1-85264-047-2.
- Yorke, Barbara (1990). Kings and Kingdoms in Early Anglo-Saxon England. Seaby. ISBN 1-85264-027-8.
- Yorke, Barbara (2021). "Royal Burial in Winchester: Context and Significance". In Lvelle, Ryan; Roffey, Simon; Weikert, Katherine (eds.). Early Medieval Winchester: Communities, Authority and Power in an Urban Space, c.800-c.1200. Oxford, UK: Oxbow Books. ISBN 978-1-78925-623-9.
