= Ealhhere =

Ealhhere (also Alhhere, fl. 839 to 853) was ealdorman of Kent. In 850, Æthelwulf, King of Wessex, granted Ealhhere a large estate of forty hides at Lenham in Kent. The following year, he and Æthelstan, the eldest son of King Æthelwulf, defeated an invading Vikings fleet in a naval battle off Sandwich in Kent. Nine ships were captured and the remainder fled. Ealhhere was killed in another battle in 853. According to the Anglo-Saxon Chronicle, "Ealhhere with the inhibitants of Kent, and Huda with the Surrey men, fought in Thanet against a heathen raiding-army; and many were killed and drowned there, and the ealdormen both dead".
