= Joanna Story =

British historian

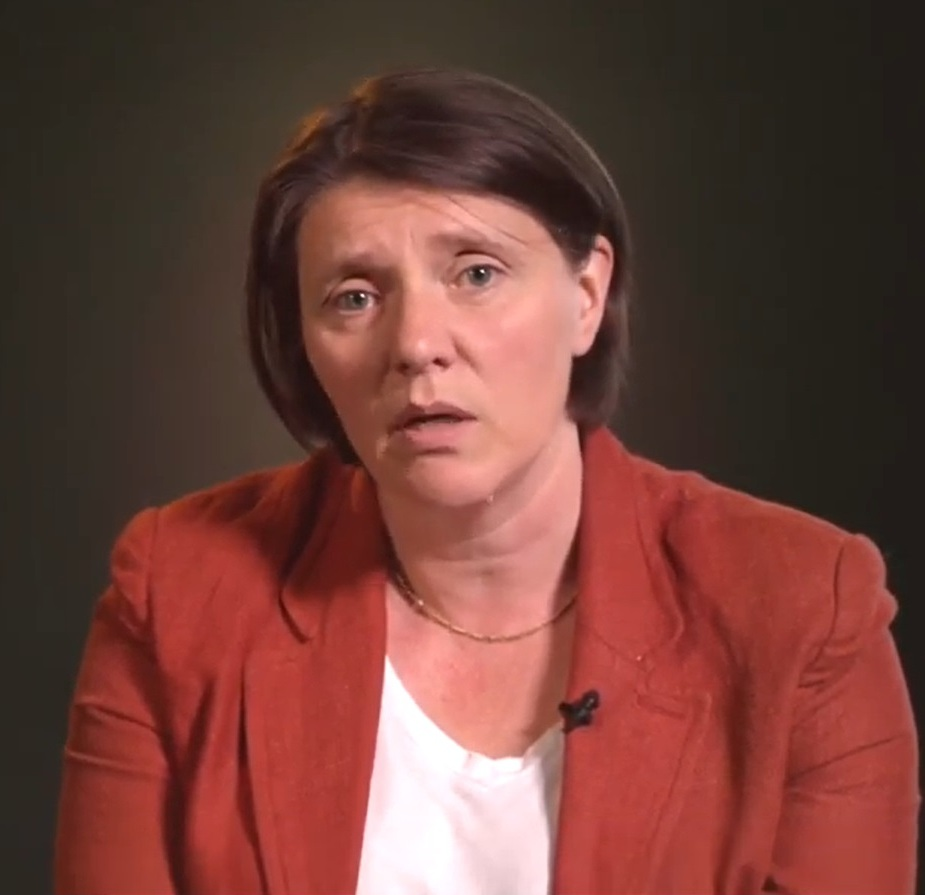
- Professor Story in 2019

Academic background
- Education: Durham University

Academic work
- Discipline: Historian
- Sub-discipline: Early medieval history; Anglo-Saxon England; Carolingian Francia
- Institutions: University of Leicester

Joanna Elizabeth Story is a British historian whose speciality is the history of and relationship between Anglo-Saxon England and Carolingian Francia.

== Biography ==
Story completed her doctorate at Durham University in 1995 with a thesis titled "Charlemagne and Northumbria: The influence of Francia on Northumbrian politics in the later eighth and early ninth centuries".

A Professor of Early Medieval History at the University of Leicester, she has published a number of academic articles, and is the editor of a collection on Charlemagne. Her monograph Carolingian Connections: Anglo-Saxon England and Carolingian Francia, c. 750–870 was praised as "revealing, relevant, and a valuable contribution to medieval history and an extremely useful addition to the corpus of texts on this period in European history". Story worked closely with colleagues at the British Library on their major international exhibition and associated exhibition catalogue Anglo-Saxon kingdoms: Art, Word, War which ran from October 2018 to February 2019.

== Bibliography ==
=== Monograph ===
- Carolingian Connections: Anglo-Saxon England and Carolingian Francia, c. 750–870 (Ashgate, 2003)
- Anglo-Saxon Kingdoms: Art, Word, War (Exhibition catalogue with Claire Breay (British Library Publishing 2018)

=== Edited collections ===
- Charlemagne: Empire and Society (Manchester: Manchester UP, 2005). ISBN 978-0719070884.
- Anglo-Saxon England and the Continent (with Hans Sauer; Arizona Center for Medieval and Renaissance Studies, 2011). ISBN 9780866984423.
