= Æthelstan: The First King of England =

2011 book by Sarah Foot

- First edition cover
- Author: Sarah Foot
- Language: English
- Subject: Æthelstan
- Genre: Biography
- Publisher: Yale University Press
- Publication date: July 12, 2011
- Publication place: United States
- ISBN: 978-0-300-12535-1

Æthelstan: The First King of England is a 2011 biography by Sarah Foot of Æthelstan, who was king of the Anglo-Saxons from 924 to 927 and the first king of the whole of England from 927 to 939. The book is one of the Yale English Monarchs series, and as of May 2025 Æthelstan is the earliest king in the series.

It includes his family life and his relationships with his numerous half-sisters and half-brothers. It discusses his role during the turbulent time for the kingdoms of Mercia, Wessex and Northumbria.
