= Eric John =

English historian

Eric John (1922–2000) was a reader in history at the University of Manchester and a specialist in Anglo-Saxon history. He was described by James Campbell as "one of the most distinguished and provocative of Anglo-Saxonists". D. H. Farmer described his studies of the English Benedictine Reform, mainly in pages 154-264 of Orbis Britanniae, as "both stimulating and provocative; even those who cannot assent to all his conclusions recognise that he has brought a new dimension to the study of the reform".

His books included:

- The king and the monks in the tenth-century Reformation. Manchester, UK: John Rylands Library. 1959. OCLC 35146827.
- Land tenure in early England; a discussion of some problems. Leicester, UK: Leicester University Press. 1960. OCLC 2311824.
- Orbis Britanniae. Leicester, UK: Leicester University Press. 1966. OCLC 398831.
- Reassessing Anglo-Saxon England. Manchester, UK: Manchester University Press. 1996. ISBN 0-7190-5053-7.

He also contributed chapters on the later Anglo-Saxon period in The Anglo-Saxons (1982), edited by James Campbell; and "The Social and Political Problems of the Early English Church" in Anglo-Saxon History: Basic Readings (2000) edited by David Pelteret.

Edward the Elder 899-924 (2001) was dedicated as a memorial to the life and work of Eric John.

== External Resources ==
Eric John papers at University of Manchester Library.
