= Nicholas Brooks (historian) =

English medieval historian

Professor Nicholas Brooks FBA
- Born: 14 January 1941; Virginia Water, Surrey, England
- Died: 2 February 2014 (aged 73)

Academic background
- Education: Winchester College
- Alma mater: Magdalen College, Oxford
- Thesis: The pre-Conquest charters of Christ Church, Canterbury (1969)
- Doctoral advisor: Dorothy Whitelock

Academic work
- Discipline: History
- Sub-discipline: Early medieval history; History of Christianity; History of Anglo-Saxon England
- Institutions: University of St Andrews; University of Birmingham

Nicholas Peter Brooks (14 January 1941 – 2 February 2014) was an English medieval historian.

== Biography ==
Nicholas Brooks was educated at Winchester College, and graduated from Magdalen College, Oxford, in 1961 with a degree in history. His doctoral studies on the Anglo-Saxon charters in the archive of Canterbury Cathedral, also undertaken at Oxford, were supervised by Dorothy Whitelock, and provided the basis for his monograph The Early History of the Church of Canterbury, published in 1984. Brooks was lecturer and then senior lecturer in medieval history at the University of St Andrews from 1964 until 1985, when he was appointed to the chair of medieval history at the University of Birmingham; in 1989 he was elected as a Fellow of the British Academy. From 1991 to 2013 he was chairman of the British Academy's Anglo-Saxon charters project, co-editing the two volumes on the Canterbury archive, published in 2013, with Susan Kelly; he also chaired the British Academy's Stenton Fund Committee, and was a member of the Fabric Advisory Committees for the cathedrals at Canterbury and Worcester. After retiring as professor of medieval history at the University of Birmingham in 2004, Brooks was an emeritus professor, in which role he continued to supervise research students. A festschrift, Myth, Rulership, Church and Charters: Essays in Honour of Nicholas Brooks, was published in 2008. Until his death, Brooks was also a member of the Research Project Advisory Panel for the study of the 7th- or 8th-century Staffordshire Hoard, which he described as "bling for warrior companions of the king".

== Publications ==
As well as "several substantial papers", Brooks's published works include the following:

- Anglo-Saxon Myths: State and Church 400–1066 (Hambledon, 2000)
- Bede and the English (Jarrow, 1999)
- Charters of Christ Church Canterbury (with Susan Kelly, 2 volumes, Oxford University, 2013)
- Church, State and Access to Resources in Early Anglo-Saxon England (Brixworth, 2003)
- Communities and Warfare 700–1400 (Hambledon, 2000)
- The Early History of the Church of Canterbury: Christ Church from 597 to 1066 (Leicester University, 1984)
- Latin and the Vernacular Languages in Early Medieval Britain (Leicester University, 1982)
- St Oswald of Worcester: Life and Influence (with Catherine Cubitt, Leicester University, 1996)
- St Wulfstan and his World (with Julia Barrow, Ashgate, 2005)

== Bibliography ==
- Gretsch, M. (2009), "Myth, Rulership, Church and Charters: Essays in Honour of Nicholas Brooks", English Historical Review, CXXIV (510): 1136–8, doi:10.1093/ehr/cep228, ISSN 0013-8266
- Kelly, S.E. (2009), Charters of Peterborough Abbey, Oxford University Press, ISBN 978-0-19-726438-6
