= David Peter Kirby =

British historian

D. P. Kirby
- Born: David Peter Kirby; 1936 (age 89–90)
- Occupation: Author

David Peter Kirby is a British historian and author, best known for writing about Anglo-Saxon history.

== Biography ==
David Peter Kirby was born in the United Kingdom in 1936. He was a lecturer at the University of Liverpool from 1962 to 1966, followed by lecturing and then leading to a professorship of history at the University College of Wales, Aberystwyth from 1993 to 1996.

== Writing ==
Kirby's published works include:

- The Making of Early England. Schocken Books, 1967.
- Saint Wilfrid at Hexham, ed. Oriel Press, 1974.
- The Earliest English Kings. Unwin Hyman, 1991.
- A Biographical Dictionary of Dark Age Britain: England, Scotland, and Wales, edited with Ann Williams and Alfred P. Smyth. Routledge, 1991.
- History and Tradition in Britain in the Early Middle Ages. 1996.
- Marvels, Magic and Witchcraft in the North Riding of Yorkshire. Summerfield Press, 2005.
- Days of Joy: Robert Hird at Home in Bedale. Summerfield Press, 2009.
