= Battle of Aclea =

Battle between the West Saxons and the Danish Vikings in 851

- Part of the Viking invasions of England
Date	851 AD
Location	Unknown location, possibly Ockley, England
Result	West Saxon victory

Belligerents
Kingdom of Wessex	Danish Warlords

Commanders and leaders
Æthelwulf	Unknown

The Battle of Aclea occurred in 851 between the West Saxons led by Æthelwulf, King of Wessex and the Danish Vikings at an unidentified location in England (noted by near-contemporaries as being in Surrey). It resulted in a West Saxon victory.

Little is known about the battle and the most important source of information comes from the Anglo-Saxon Chronicle which recorded that:

three and a half hundred ships came into the mouth of the Thames and stormed Canterbury and London and put to flight Beorhtwulf, King of Mercia with his army, and then went south over the Thames into Surrey and King Æthelwulf and his son Æthelbald with the West Saxon army fought against them at Aclea, and there made the greatest slaughter of a heathen raiding-army that we have heard tell of up to the present day, and there took the victory."

Aclea means Oak Field, as Asser explained. This could survive as Oakley or Ockley. Ockley is a village in Surrey that could potentially be a location for the battle. If the Vikings followed Stane Street south from London Bridge, which was then the only crossing over the Thames into the area covered by modern-day Surrey, they would have come to a gap in the North Downs and passed through in the direction of Dorking. If the West Saxons were coming north along Stane Street then they could have met at Ockley.

Oakley, Hampshire is another potential location for the battle. Asser defines Surrey, rather vaguely, as "a district which is situated on the southern bank of the River Thames, to the West of Kent"—the River Thames running all the way from the east coast of England to west of Swindon. Though located within the modern-day borders of the county of Hampshire, rather than in Surrey, there is evidence to suggest that a now-forgotten battle had taken place near Oakley at some point, including numerous tumuli and several early-medieval skeletons buried underneath the floor of a local church. Anglo-Saxon jewellery associated with Æthelwulf has also been found only a few miles south-west of the village.
