= Richard Abels =

American historian of Anglo-Saxon England

Richard Abels (born 1951) is an American educator, historian, and professor emeritus at the United States Naval Academy. Abels is a specialist in the military and political institutions of Anglo-Saxon England. He is a Fellow of the Royal Historical Society (elected 1990) and a Fellow of the Medieval Academy of America (2024). Abels' approach to medieval military history focuses upon the influence of culture upon the practice and representation of warfare. With his wife Ellen Harrison, Abels is also the co-author of an article examining the role played by women in the Cathar heresy based upon a statistical analysis of Inquisitiorial registers.

Richard Philip Abels was born on October 31, 1951 in Brooklyn, New York, United States, the son of Milton and Blanche Abels. Abels received a Bachelor of Arts degree from Columbia College in 1973. Two years later, he earned a Master of Arts from Columbia University, and in 1982 was awarded a Doctor of Philosophy degree by the same university. Abels’ dissertation, written under the direction of J.M.W. Bean, became the basis for his first book, Lordship and Military Obligation in Anglo-Saxon England.

Richard Abels began his teaching career as a preceptor at Columbia University in 1977. He held this position until 1980, becoming an instructor there in 1981. From 1981 to 1982, he served as a visiting assistant professor at Cornell College. In 1982, Abels was hired by the United States Naval Academy as an assistant professor of history. He was promoted to associate professor in 1986, and to full professor in 1991. From 2008 to 2014, he served as Chair of the Naval Academy’s History Department. He retired in 2017 and was awarded the title of Professor Emeritus in the following year.

Abels’ study of the central importance of lordship to the military organization of Anglo-Saxon England, his biographies of the West Saxon kings Alfred the Great and Ethelred the Unready, and his study of the influence of culture upon the representation and practice of medieval warfare, have opened new vistas on the study of medieval war, kingship, governance, society, and culture. Abels' scholarship is marked by an appreciation of the role played by contingency in historical causation and a penchant to prefer complementarity over binary contrasts. The latter is exemplified by his demonstration of the varied ways in which military obligation fell upon different sectors of Anglo-Saxon society, his recognition of the multiple and competing conceptions of chivalry, and the differences between the representations of warfare in pictorial and literary texts and its actual practice.

Although Abels’ scholarship has focused on early medieval England and medieval warfare, one of his earliest and most important works is “The Participation of Women in Languedocian Catharism” (Mediaeval Studies 61, 1970), co-authored with his wife Ellen Harrison. That article, which began as Harrison’s senior thesis at Barnard College, is a study of the role played by women in the southern French heresy based upon a statistical analysis of inquisitorial records, most notably ms. 609 of the Bibliothèque Municipal of Toulouse, containing the depositions of some 5600 witnesses taken by the inquisitors Bernard de Caux and Jean de Saint-Pierre between 1245 and 1246. The initial aim of the project was to gain a better understanding of the so-called Frauenfrage, which sought to explain why women were disproportionately attracted to the heresy and was one of the key questions of Cathar historiography. Abels and Harrison’s statistical analysis, however, found that women formed at most a percentage of the Cathar community proportionate to their share of the general population. In most cases, female Cathars, both among the ministry and the laity, participated in the heresy as members of families rather than joining as individuals. These observations led Abels and Harrison to reject the Frauenfrage, speculating that it originated from Catholic polemics rather than from women’s actual participation in the Cathar heresy.

== Selected publications ==
- Alfred the Great: War, Kingship and Culture in Anglo-Saxon England. London: Longman, 1998.
- Æthelred the Unready: The Failed King. Penguin Monarchs Series, Penguin U.K., 2018.
- Lordship and Military Obligation in Anglo-Saxon England. Berkeley and Los Angeles: University of California, 1988.
- The Normans and their Adversaries: Essays in Memory of C. Warren Hollister. Co-edited with Bernard Bachrach. Woodbridge, Suffolk: Boydell and Brewer, 2001.
- "The Participation of Women in Languedocian Catharism." Mediaeval Studies 41 (1979): 215-251. (With Ellen Harrison.)

In 2022, Abels began the podcast "'Tis But A Scratch: Fact & Fiction About the Middle Ages," which compares popular conceptions of the Middle Ages to their underlying historical reality
