= Ann Williams (historian) =

English medievalist, historian and author

Ann Williams (born 1937) is an English medievalist, historian and author. Before retiring she worked at the Polytechnic of North London, where she was Senior Lecturer in Medieval History. She is a Fellow of the Society of Antiquaries and a research fellow at the University of East Anglia. Her numerous works include:

- A Biographical Dictionary of Dark Age Britain: England, Scotland, and Wales, c.500–c.1050, Routledge (1991), with Alfred P. Smyth and D. P. Kirby. Williams wrote the English entries.
- The English and the Norman Conquest (Woodbridge, 1995)
- Land, Power and Politics: the family estates and patronage of Odda of Deerhurst (Deerhurst, 1997)
- Kingship and Government in Pre-Conquest England, c. 500–1066 (London, 1999)
- Æthelred the Unready: the ill-counselled king (London, 2003)
- The World Before Domesday: the English aristocracy, 900–1066 (London, 2008)
