= Alfred P. Smyth =

Irish-born historian (1942–2016)

Professor Alfred P. Smyth (1 July 1942 – 16 October 2016) was an Irish-born historian specialising in the mediaeval history of the British Isles. In 2002 he was named Dean of Arts and Humanities at Canterbury Christ Church University College, having been Director of Research there since 1999. He was also Warden of St. George's House, Windsor Castle. Earlier, he was Professor of Mediaeval History at the University of Kent, when he was Master of Keynes College.

== Works ==
- Scandinavian Kings in the British Isles, Oxford University Press, Oxford, 1977, ISBN 0-19-821865-6
- Warlords and Holy Men: Scotland AD 80-1000, Edinburgh, Edward Arnold (Publishers) Ltd, 1984, ISBN 0-7131-6305-4
- Scandinavian York and Dublin: The history and archaeology of two related Viking kingdoms, Irish academic press, Dublin, 1987, ISBN 0-7165-2365-5
- A Biographical Dictionary of Dark Age Britain: England, Scotland and Wales c. 500 – c. 1050, in collaboration with Ann Williams, Seaby, London, 1991, ISBN 1-85264-047-2
- King Alfred the Great, Oxford University Press, Oxford, 1995, ISBN 0-19-822989-5
- Medieval Europeans: Studies in ethnic identity and national perspectives in Medieval Europe, MacMillan, London, 1998, ISBN 0-333-67219-4
- Seanchas: Studies in early and medieval Irish archaeology, history and literature in honour of Francis J. Byrne, Four Courts Press, Dublin, 2000, ISBN 1-85182-489-8

== See also ==
- Asser § Claims of forgery
