= Regularis Concordia =

Regularis Concordia may refer to:

- Rule of St Benedict, a book of precepts for monks
- Regularis Concordia (Winchester), a document produced at Winchester in c. 973 as part of the Benedictine Reform movement
