= English Benedictine Reform =

Religious reform movement in the late Anglo-Saxon period

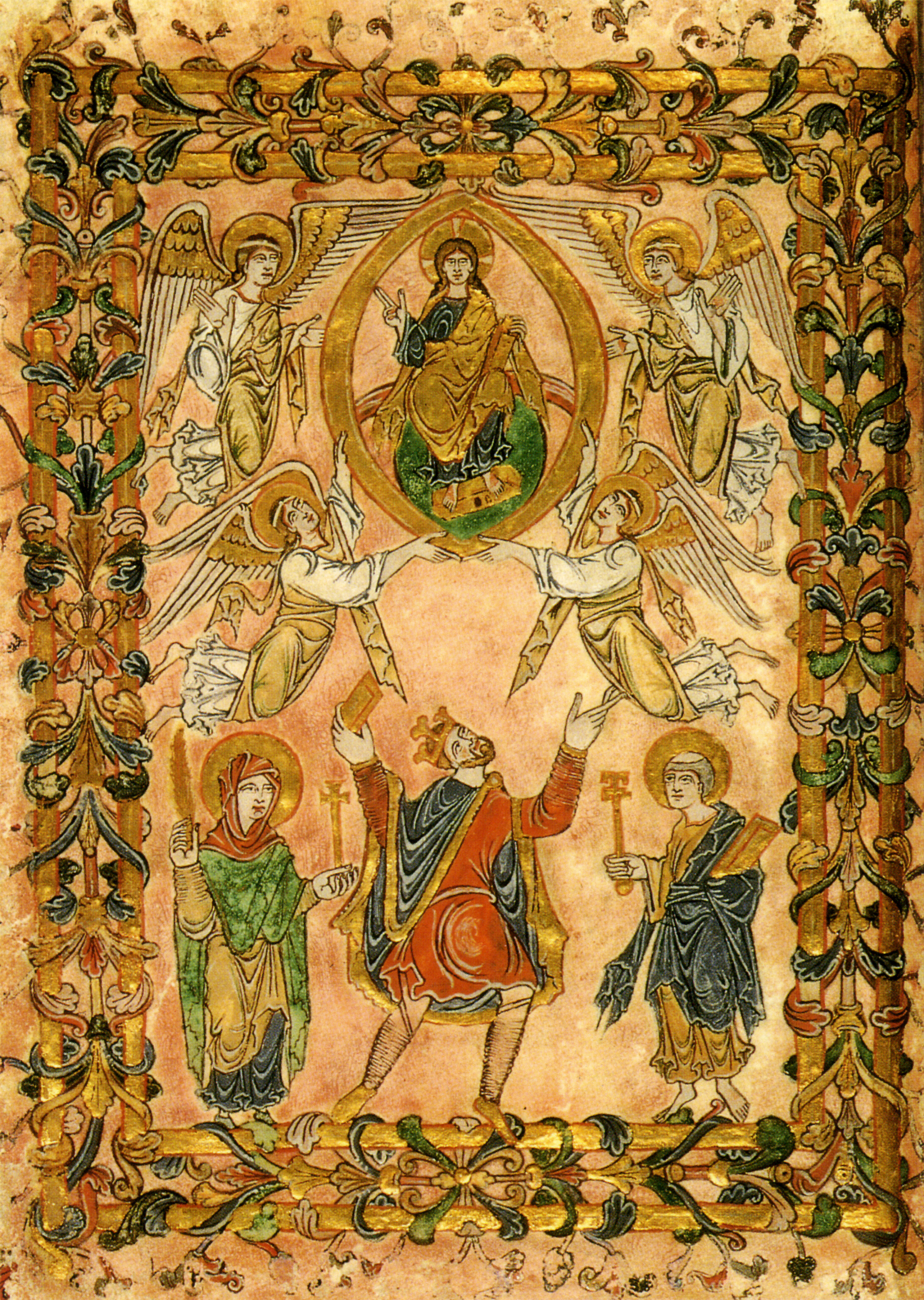
Portrait of King Edgar in the charter of the New Minster, Winchester

The English Benedictine Reform or Monastic Reform of the English church in the late tenth century was a religious and intellectual movement in the later Anglo-Saxon period. In the mid-tenth century almost all religious establishments were staffed by secular clergy, who were often married. The reformers sought to replace them with celibate contemplative monks following the Rule of Saint Benedict. The movement was inspired by Continental monastic reforms, and the leading figures were Dunstan, Archbishop of Canterbury, Æthelwold, Bishop of Winchester, and Oswald, Archbishop of York.

In seventh- and eighth-century England, most monasteries were Benedictine, but in the ninth century learning and monasticism declined severely. Alfred the Great (871–899) deplored the decline and started to reverse it. The court of Æthelstan (924–939), the first king of the whole of England, was cosmopolitan, and future reformers such as Dunstan and Æthelwold learned from Continental exponents of Benedictine monasticism. The English movement became dominant under King Edgar (959–975), who supported the expulsion of secular clergy from religious establishments, and their replacement by monks. The reformers had close relations with the Crown, furthering its interests and depending on its support. The movement was confined to southern England and the Midlands, as the Crown was not strong enough in northern England to confiscate property from local elites there to establish Benedictine foundations. The movement declined after the deaths of its leading exponents at the end of the tenth century.

The artistic workshops established by Æthelwold reached a high standard of craftsmanship in manuscript illustration, sculpture and gold and silver, and were influential both in England and on the Continent. In his monasteries, learning reached a high standard, producing competent prose and poetry in the elaborate hermeneutic style of Latin favoured in tenth-century England. His Winchester school played an important role in creating the standard vernacular West Saxon literary language, and his pupil Ælfric was its most eminent writer.

All surviving medieval accounts of the movement are by supporters of reform, who strongly condemned what they saw as the corruption and religious inadequacy of the secular clergy, but historians in the late twentieth and early twenty-first centuries have increasingly seen these accounts as unfairly biased against the secular clergy.

== Background ==
The author of the Rule of Saint Benedict, which was the principal monastic code in Western Europe in the early Middle Ages, was Saint Benedict of Nursia (480–550). Under this Rule the lives of the monks were mainly devoted to prayer, together with reading sacred texts and manual work. They lived a communal life and were required to give complete obedience to their abbot. Benedict's achievement was to produce a stable system characterised by moderation and prudence.

The seventh century saw the development of a powerful monastic movement in England, which was strongly influenced by the ideas of St Benedict, and the late seventh-century English scholar Aldhelm assumed that monasteries would normally follow the Benedictine Rule. However, by 800, few foundations could claim high spiritual and intellectual standards, and the ninth century saw a sharp decline in learning and monasticism. Political and financial pressures, partly due to disruption caused by Viking attacks, led to an increasing preference for pastoral clergy, who provided essential religious services to the laity, over contemplative monks. There was a progressive transfer of property from the minsters to the Crown, which accelerated after 850. According to John Blair:

To a significant extent, the royal administration had achieved territorial stability by battening onto minsters. Well might late tenth-century polemicists blame kings of Wessex and their magnates, even more than the Vikings, for despoiling the church's resources. The scars of Viking raids had healed, but the secularization of minsters continued on its slow, consistent course.

At the end of the ninth century Alfred the Great started to revive learning and monasticism, (Note: Historians disagree whether the Benedictine reform originated with Alfred. David Dumville in "King Alfred and the Tenth-Century Reform of the English Church" argues that the revival of monasticism was the ultimate goal of Alfred's programme. This view is rejected by Richard Abels and David Pratt, and ignored by Patrick Wormald in his Oxford Dictionary of National Biography article about Alfred. However, David Farmer sees Alfred as the "precursor of the revival" and John Blair argues that the views of Alfred's circle "began a broadening of horizons that was to culminate in monastic reform under Edgar".) and this work was carried on by his grandson, King Æthelstan (924–939). Kings before Edgar (959–975) did not take the view, which was adopted by Æthelwold and his circle, that the only worthwhile religious life was Benedictine monasticism. When Gérard of Brogne reformed the Abbey of Saint Bertin in Saint-Omer along Benedictine lines in 944, dissident monks found a refuge in England under King Edmund (939–946). Before the tenth-century reform, the lines between secular clergy and monastics were sometimes blurred. There are cases of communities of monks established to provide pastoral care, and clergy in some secular establishments lived according to monastic rules.

== Early development ==
The Benedictine reform movement on the Continent started with the foundation of Cluny Abbey in Burgundy in 909–10, but the influence of Cluny, which was innovative in its customs, was largely confined to Burgundy. England's closest links were with the more conservative Fleury Abbey on the Loire, which had great prestige because it held Saint Benedict's body. The leaders of the English movement were also influenced by the reforms which had been promulgated by the Carolingian Holy Roman Emperor, Louis the Pious, at the Synods of Aachen in the 810s, and particularly their promulgation of uniform monastic rules under the authority of the Crown. Modest religious and diplomatic contacts between England and the Continent under Alfred and his son Edward the Elder (899–924) intensified during the reign of Æthelstan, which saw the start of the monastic revival. Four of Æthelstan's half-sisters married European rulers, resulting in closer contacts between the English and Continental courts than ever before. Many manuscripts were imported, influencing English art and scholarship, and English churchmen learnt about the Continental Benedictine reform movement.

The leaders of the English Benedictine reform were Dunstan, Archbishop of Canterbury (959–988), Æthelwold, Bishop of Winchester (963–984), and Oswald, Archbishop of York (971–992). Dunstan and Æthelwold reached maturity in Æthelstan's cosmopolitan, intellectual court in the 930s, where they met monks from the European reformed houses which provided the inspiration for the English movement. In the early 940s Dunstan was appointed Abbot of Glastonbury, where he was joined by Æthelwold, and they spent much of the next decade studying Benedictine texts at Glastonbury, which became the first centre for disseminating monastic reform. The Rule of Saint Benedict was translated into Old English at this time, probably by Æthelwold, and it is the only surviving prose translation of the Rule into a European vernacular in the early Middle Ages. In about 954 Æthelwold wished to go to the Continent to study reforms there at first hand, but King Eadred (946–955) refused him permission and appointed him Abbot of Abingdon, which became the second centre. Dunstan was exiled by King Eadwig (955–959) between 956 and 958, and he spent this time observing Benedictine practices at St Peter's Abbey in Ghent. Æthelwold on the other hand appears to have been on good terms with Eadwig, an early indication that the reformers were not united politically. Oswald was a nephew of Oda, Archbishop of Canterbury from 941 to 958. Oda, a supporter of reform, introduced Oswald to Fleury, where he was ordained and spent a large part of the 950s.

== Reform and the Crown ==
Rosamond McKitterick observes that "the zeal for monastic reform undoubtedly was a common bond right across Europe". The main centres were Lotharingia, western France and southern England, and the reforms were supported by rulers who saw model monasteries as promoting their power and prestige. However, relations between monasteries and their patrons varied. Where rulers were weak, as in Burgundy, Cluny looked to the papacy for protection, whereas in other areas such as Flanders, monasteries had close links with local rulers. In England there was a close dependence on the royal family and very little papal influence. The accession in 959 of Edgar, the first king to strongly support reform, led to court support for the imposition of Benedictine rules on a number of old minsters with monks imported from houses such as Oswald's Westbury on Trym, Dunstan's Glastonbury and Æthelwold's Abingdon. Hardly any of the reformed houses were new foundations, but a few nunneries, which had royal connections, were established in Wiltshire and Hampshire.

When Edgar became king, he immediately dismissed the newly appointed Archbishop of Canterbury, Byrhthelm, and appointed Dunstan in his place. In 963, Edgar appointed Æthelwold as Bishop of Winchester, and with the permission of the pope and the support of the king the new bishop expelled the secular clergy from the city's Old and New Minsters and replaced them with monks. The secular clerks and their supporters were local people of consequence, and the king had to resort to force to confiscate their wealthy benefices. By 975 up to 30 male houses and 7 or 8 nunneries had been reformed, all in Wessex or places in the Midlands where Æthelwold and Oswald held property. However, the reformed houses were then probably only around 10 per cent of the religious establishments. The wealthiest reformed monasteries were far richer than ordinary secular minsters, and the Domesday Book shows in the late eleventh century some possessed land worth as much as all but the greatest lay magnates, but rich and important unreformed houses such as Chester-le-Street and Bury St Edmunds flourished into the eleventh century. The reformers' propaganda, mainly from Æthelwold's circle, claimed that the church was transformed in Edgar's reign, but in Blair's view the religious culture "when we probe beneath the surface, starts to look less exclusive and more like that of Æthelstan's and Edmund's".

Edgar was concerned about divergent interpretations of the Benedictine Rule in different monasteries in his kingdom, and wanted to impose uniform rules to be followed by all. The rules were set out in the key document of the English reform, the Regularis Concordia, which was adopted by the Council of Winchester in around 970. (Note: Historians generally date the Regularis Concordia to about 973, but Julia Barrow argues for the mid-960s.) The Concordia was written by Æthelwold, who had sought advice from Ghent and Fleury Abbeys. A major aim of the Concordia was the regularisation of the form of church services, and Æthelwold tried to synthesise what he regarded as the best Continental and English practice.

On the Continent there were different interpretations of the Benedictine Rule, but in England uniform practice was a matter of political principle. The Concordia said that King Edgar "urged all to be of one mind as regards monastic usage ... and so, with their minds anchored firmly on the ordinances of the Rule, to avoid all dissension, lest differing ways of observing the customs of one Rule and one country should bring their holy conversation into disrepute." Fleury's customs were the most important influence on the Regularis Concordia, and Fleury itself may have been influenced by English liturgical practices.

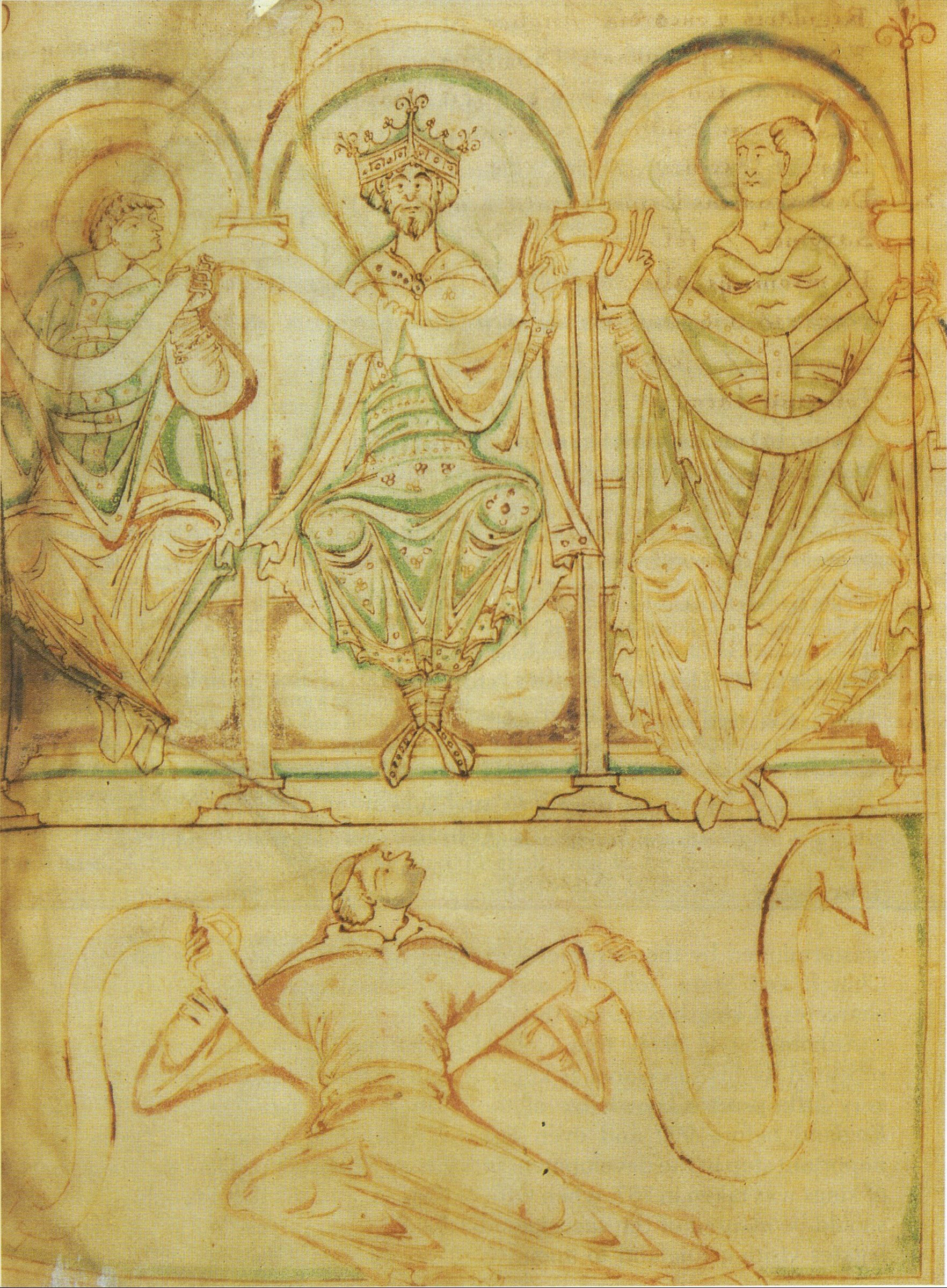
King Edgar seated between Bishop Æthelwold and Archbishop Dunstan, from an eleventh-century manuscript of the Regularis Concordia

The conquest of the Danelaw by West Saxon kings had united England in a single kingdom for the first time, enabling kings from Æthelstan onwards to see themselves as heirs of the Carolingian emperors; the regulation of monasteries by a uniform Benedictine Rule was designed to unite the kingdom ideologically and enhance royal prestige. The monks depended on the king in a way that the local ealdormen did not, so their loyalty could be trusted and they could act as a counterbalance to powerful local families. The Regularis Concordia required that psalms be said for the king and the queen in monasteries several times a day, and specified that royal consent must be obtained for the election of abbots. The reformers aimed to enhance the Christian character of kingship, and one aspect of this was to raise the status of the queen; Edgar's last wife, Ælfthryth, was the first king's consort to regularly witness charters as regina.

The reformers' propaganda claimed that England had been unified as a result of the wide acceptance of Benedictinism, and that the movement's greatest benefactor, King Edgar, had played a major role in the unification by his demands for adherence to the Benedictine Rule. Æthelwold probably tutored Edgar as a boy, and was very close to him; it is likely that Æthelwold was influential in persuading the king to carry through his reforms and support Benedictine monasticism. Monks became dominant in the episcopacy during his reign.

Æthelwold was close to Queen Ælfthryth and supported the claim of her son Æthelred (978–1016) to be king against his elder half-brother, Edward (975–978). Dunstan supported Edward, who succeeded on Edgar's death in 975. Æthelred became king on his half-brother's murder in 978, and Æthelwold became a powerful figure at court until his death in 984.

== The nobility and the reform ==
Nobles made donations to reformed foundations for religious reasons, and many believed that they could save their souls by patronising holy men who would pray for them, and thus help to expiate their sins. In some cases gifts were a payment for the right to be buried at a monastery. Some aristocrats founded new monasteries; for example, Æthelwine, Ealdorman of East Anglia, founded Ramsey Abbey in 969, gave it many gifts, and translated the relics of two martyred princes to it. Gifts were designed to increase the prestige of both the donor and recipient, as when Ealdorman Byrhtnoth of Essex, later to be the hero of the Battle of Maldon, gave Ely Abbey "thirty mancuses of gold, twenty pounds of silver, two gold crosses, two lace palls containing precious works of gold and gems, and two finely made gloves". The twelfth-century local chronicle, the Liber Eliensis, records that he gave the abbey fourteen estates. Upon his death his widow added a large hanging worked with images of his victories, which had apparently previously been displayed at their house, and a gold torc.

Nobles' choice of recipient was determined by their relationship with individual monks and other aristocrats. An individual would patronise the same foundations that other family members and allies supported, but despoil the property of houses associated with his political adversaries. Æthelwine of East Anglia and Ælfhere, Ealdorman of Mercia were the leaders of the two rival factions. Ælfhere seized land of Æthelwine's Ramsey and was an enemy of Archbishop Oswald and an ally of Bishop Æthelwold. Æthelwine, a friend of Oswald, sometimes seized land belonging to Æthelwold's Ely. Oswald himself used his position to assist his relatives, leasing Worcester lands to them in ways which had been forbidden by ninth-century synods. The historian Janet Pope comments: "It appears that religion, even monasticism, could not break the tight kin group as the basic social structure in tenth-century England."

The three leaders of the movement were all aristocrats, and they were able to get the support of their family and friends as well as the king. In Pope's view "this close link between the monks and the nobles is ultimately the most important factor in the success of the reform". Wormald agrees, stating that aristocratic support for monastic reform was more important for its success than royal or papal sponsorship. The aristocracy did not confine their support to reformed foundations, but continued to donate to unreformed ones.

== Monks and clerics ==
Nicholas Brooks describes Dunstan as "the ablest and best loved figure that tenth-century England produced", and observes that his "example helped to inspire a massive transfer of landed resources from the secular aristocracy to the religious aristocracy; it made possible a revival of scholarly, religious, pastoral and cultural standards in late tenth-century England that gave a distinctively monastic character to the English church and hierarchy". But Brooks admits that it is very difficult to point to any specific contribution that Dunstan made to the reform, partly because none of his biographers were well informed about his career after he became Archbishop of Canterbury. Nicola Robertson questions Dunstan's importance: "At the present time it would be unwise to give a definitive answer to the question whether Dunstan's role as the instigator of a monastic reform movement was a tenth-century fact or a twelfth-century fiction."

Æthelwold reformed monasteries in his own diocese of Winchester, and he also helped to restore houses in eastern England, such as Peterborough, Ely, Thorney and St Neots. Almost all had been monasteries in the seventh century, and had later become communities of secular clerks or transferred to secular ownership, so he could argue that he was just restoring their original status. He also restored nunneries, working with his ally, Queen Ælfthryth. He did not merely attempt to revive the historical church, but also to improve it by inventing dubious pedigrees for his houses. He was the main propagandist for the movement, and wrote all the major works supporting it in England during Edgar's reign.

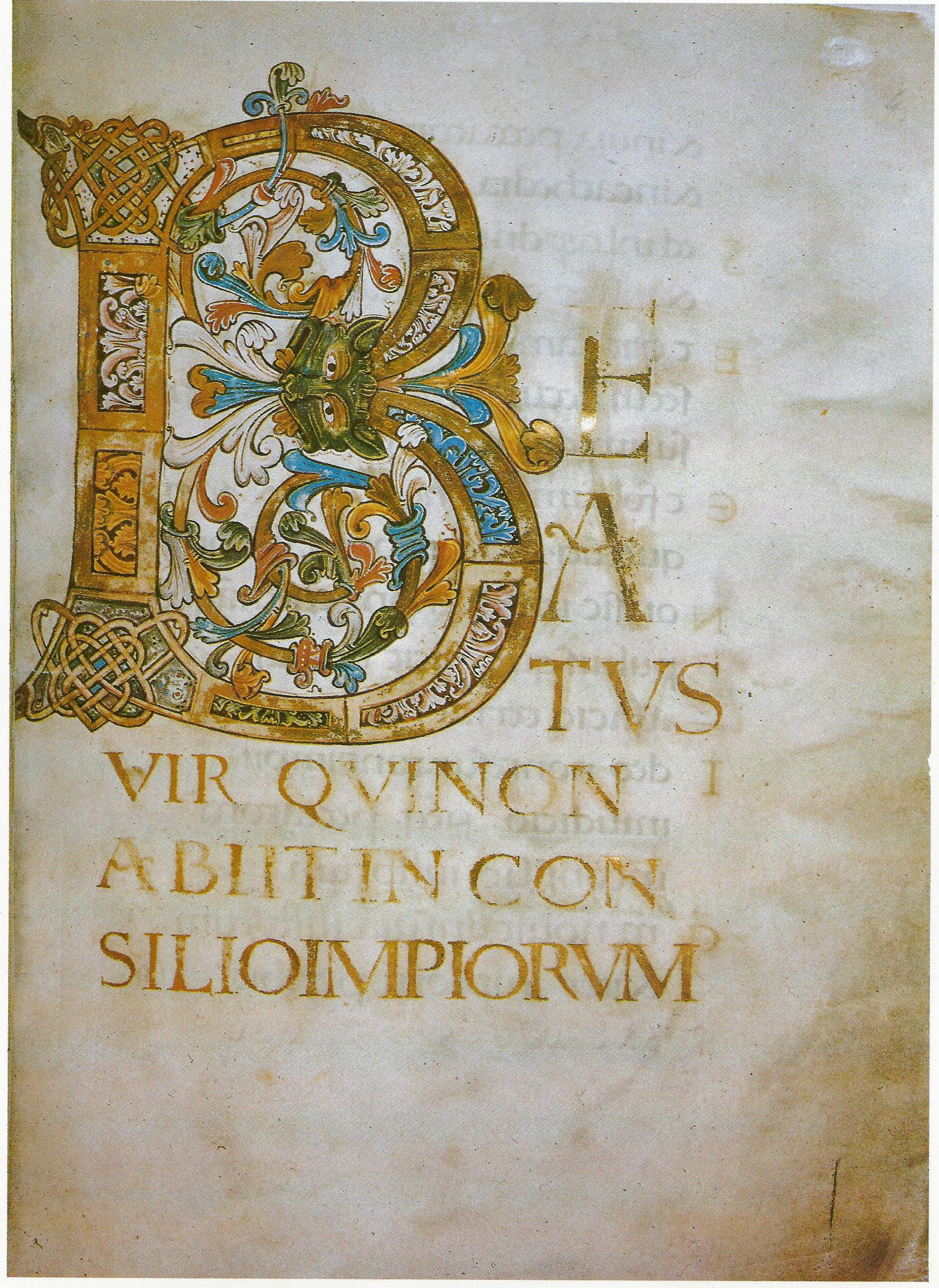
Initial letter "B" in the Ramsey Psalter, which was probably designed for the use of Archbishop Oswald

Blair describes the basic aim of the movement, both in England and on the Continent, as being "to establish and disseminate high liturgical, spiritual and pastoral standards". Cooper comments: "Even though the English reform was inspired by Continental precedent, it was never a mere imitation; rather, it melded Continental reform monasticism with more thorough-going ideas for the creation of a 'Holy Society' in England." On the Continent, cathedral chapters were staffed by secular canons, and only monasteries had monks. Æthelwold rejected this distinction; his expulsion of clerics in favour of monks from Winchester Cathedral (the Old Minster) as well as the New Minster introduced a unique feature to the English reform. Dunstan and Oswald hesitated to follow his example, probably because unlike Æthelwold they had lived abroad and understood Continental practice, and also because they preferred a gradualist approach to Æthelwold's confrontational strategy. Oswald installed monks at Worcester Cathedral, (Note: Oswald was appointed Bishop of Worcester in 961, and retained the position when he was appointed Archbishop of York in 971.) but he built a new church for them and retained the clerics, who were educated with the monks in the same classroom. Canterbury did not become fully monastic until after Dunstan's death. Æthelwold was a historian who was reviving what he believed to be the practice of the past, particularly Pope Gregory the Great's injunction to Augustine in the Libellus Responsionum, as reported by Bede, that Augustine should continue as a bishop to live the life of a monk. Blair argues that large religious establishments could not function without priests carrying out parochial duties, and he comments that "Æthelwold's rejection of all forms of religious life but the monastic was decidedly odd. The lurid stigmatizations of clerics as foul, lazy, and lascivious come mainly from his circle." Although the Rule of Saint Benedict barred monks from engaging in external ministry, English Benedictines were actively engaged in pastoral work and teaching the secular clergy. The reformers agreed in condemning the usual practice of clerics taking wives, and a leading Benedictine of the next generation, Wulfstan, Archbishop of York, cited approvingly Dunstan's view that married clerics who were charged with crimes should be tried as laymen. Reformers also regarded individual prebends as corrupt, and wished to impose communal ownership of property.

Dunstan's first biographer, called "B", was a secular cleric who was in Dunstan's retinue in Glastonbury, and left for Liège in around 960. After 980 he made several attempts to gain the patronage of leading English churchmen, but they were unsuccessful, probably because monastic reformers were unwilling to assist a secular canon living abroad. The secular priests lacked able scholars to defend themselves, and no defence against Æthelwold's charges has survived. The leading twelfth-century historians, John of Worcester and William of Malmesbury, were Benedictines who reinforced the seculars' negative image. The diverse minsters and religious practices of Anglo-Saxon England were disguised by a small group which obtained a near monopoly of the religious record and presented an unreal picture of religious uniformity.

== Saints and relics ==
Reformers attached great importance to the elevation and translation of saints, moving their bodies from their initial resting place to a higher and more prominent location to make them more accessible for veneration. An important precursor was the seventh-century translation of the remains of St Benedict himself from Monte Cassino to Fleury Abbey. By the tenth century, translation usually involved a grand procession, an elaborate new shrine and often reconstruction of the church. Almost nothing is known of the life of Swithun, who was an obscure ninth-century Bishop of Winchester until Æthelwold launched a major cult of him as a saint, and translated his grave from outside the Old Minster to a new shrine inside. After Æthelwold's own death in 984 his progress to becoming the subject of a cult followed the conventional path: his grave is said to have been neglected until he appeared in a vision to say that his body should be moved, and his successor Ælfheah then built a new choir to hold his body, where it became the focus of miracles.

Saints were believed to have an active power after death, and the reformers made great efforts to transfer saints' remains and relics from obscure minsters to their own new establishments. Characteristically, Æthelwold showed great energy in this. Gifts of land and other possessions to a church were often expressed as donations to its principal saint, so the seizure of such a saint's remains from an unreformed community could then justify the transfer of its wealth to a Benedictine monastery, on the ground that as property had been donated to the saint, it should follow his or her body to its new home. The reformers had what Alan Thacker calls a "mania for saint-making and relic collecting". Thefts of relics from unreformed communities to increase a church's collection were common, such as Ely Abbey's "relic raid" on Dereham in 974 to obtain the remains of Saint Wihtburg. This was probably associated with the acquisition by Ely of Dereham church, and may have been a means of ensuring that the abbey kept possession of the church's estates. According to Thacker, Æthelwold's activities were "on an unrivalled scale":

Not all, one suspects, were yielded willingly to Æthelwold's grasping representatives ... Æthelwold obviously wanted his monasteries to be centres of spiritual power, an aim he sought to fulfil by making them the home of as many saints as possible. Undoubtedly too he was anxious to remove relics from the guardianship of secular communities to a reformed monastic environment. But ultimately even more vital was the link between cult and territorial possession, focused on the saint's role as protector and spiritual lord of his community.

On the other hand, although Oswald was active in promoting cults, he does not generally seem to have used relic collecting as a means of gaining control of the assets of secular communities, and Dunstan displayed no interest in relics.

== Landscape planning ==
One of the innovations imported from Continental Europe by the Augustinian mission at the end of the sixth century was Roman grid planning, called centuriation, in which landscapes were planned respecting geometrically correct grids of squares. Between around 600 and 800 the location and orientation of roads, buildings and property boundaries on a number of elite sites respected planning grids, including the early seventh century royal centre at Yeavering, where a Roman surveying instrument called a groma has been found. The method went out of use around 800 as a result of the decline in monastic culture.

Grid planning survived in the Carolingian Empire, and it was revived in England after 940 by monastic reformers, who probably imported gromatic manuscripts from the Continent. The technology can rarely be demonstrated on reformed monastic sites as it is generally obscured by post-Conquest development, but it is apparent at Æthelwold's Peterborough Abbey and the early eleventh century Eynsham Abbey. Grid planning is also found at elite secular sites such as the royal hunting lodge at Cheddar in Somerset. The periods from 600 to 800 and 940 to 1020 were when monastic power and wealth were at their height, and it may have only been at these times that the educated and literate personnel required for grid planning could be found. In 600 to 800 most grid planned villages were on land owned by monasteries, but in the later period the technology is more commonly found on sites under secular ownership, perhaps because other landlords and even rural communities seized on the technology. In some cases, grid planning of tenth and eleventh century villages is still visible in nineteenth century Ordnance Survey maps. Grid planning declined in the early eleventh century, perhaps because the monastic reform was itself losing impetus. Land surveying of the twelfth to the fifteenth centuries was amateurish compared with pre-Conquest grid planning.

== Later history ==
After the death of King Edgar in 975, aristocrats who had lost land and family religious houses to the reformed monasteries took advantage of the disputed succession between Edgar's sons to seize back their property. Ælfhere of Mercia took the lead in the "anti-monastic reaction", against defenders of the reformed houses such as Æthelwine of East Anglia, and Byrhtnoth, later to be the hero of The Battle of Maldon. According to Byrhtferth of Ramsey Abbey, "monks were smitten with fear, the people trembled; and clerics were filled with joy, for their time had come. Abbots were expelled with their monks, clerics were installed with their wives, and the error was worse than before."

Ann Williams argues that a long-standing rivalry between Ælfhere and Æthelwine was an important factor in the disturbances which followed Edgar's death. She comments:

There is no reason to regard [Ælfhere] as particularly 'anti-monastic'. The attitudes of all parties towards the reform movement were as much political as religious. Æthelwine was no 'friend of God' so far as Ely was concerned, and it has been suggested that only his friendship with Oswald prevented him from being accused of 'anti-monastic' activities himself. All the lay noblemen of the time had cause for alarm at the great increase in wealth and power enjoyed by the reformed monasteries in the 960s and 970s and the sometimes dubious means they employed to acquire land.

The "anti-monastic reaction" was short-lived, but the reformed monasteries went into a long-term decline, and they were hard hit by the renewal of Viking attacks and high taxation from the 980s. Blair comments: "For all their great and continuing achievements, the reformed houses after the 970s lived more on inherited capital than on dynamic growth." However, Cooper sees two later generations of reformers as important. The second in the years around 1000 was led by Ælfric and Wulfstan, who tried to bring greater lay involvement in the creation of the 'Holy Society'. She observes that "Ælfric has traditionally been seen as the epitome of the second generation of the reform movement, and his work is certainly vital to our understanding of the period". The third generation was led by Æthelnoth, Archbishop of Canterbury from 1020 to 1038, the scribe Eadwig Basan and the schoolmaster and colloquist Ælfric Bata.

No spiritual leaders of the church emerged in the eleventh century comparable with the three main figures of the monastic reform, and the position of monks in English religious and political life declined. There were very few important new foundations, the main exception being Bury St Edmunds, where a Benedictine community replaced a clerical one early in the century. There were also a few more monasteries founded by lay nobility, the last being Coventry Abbey in 1045, founded by Leofric, Earl of Mercia and his wife Godgifu. Monks lost their near monopoly on bishoprics, partly because Edward the Confessor, who spent his early life abroad, preferred foreign clerics in his episcopal appointments, but mainly because the development of royal government required a permanent staff, and this was supplied by secular royal priests, who would be rewarded by nomination to bishoprics. The influence of the centralising Regularis Concordia declined following the deaths of the founders of the movement, and there was increasing localism in the eleventh century, with few links between monasteries.

The enthusiasm for relics continued, and foundations' prestige was greatly increased by success in obtaining the remains of important saints. The period between the Benedictine reform and the Norman Conquest saw the most lavish donations of land to monasteries of any period in medieval England, and the leading reformed foundations became immensely wealthy, retaining their status after the Conquest. Monasteries founded in the Anglo-Saxon period enjoyed greater prosperity and prestige than post-Conquest establishments.

== Importance of the reform movement ==
The historian Simon Keynes describes the Benedictine reform as "the particular aspect of [Edgar's] reign which has come to dominate all others". Keynes says:

The principal motivation or driving force behind the re-establishment of religious houses in the kingdom of the English, living in strict accordance with the Rule of Saint Benedict, was a desire to restore to their former glory some of the ancient houses known from the pages of Bede's Ecclesiastical History of the English People, from other literary works, from historical traditions of the later eighth and ninth centuries, or indeed from the physical remains of buildings ... Modern historians will recognise how much was owed to the monastic reform movements on the continent, and will find extra dimensions, such as a wish to extend royal influence into areas where a king of the West Saxon line might not expect his writ to run, or a more general wish to revive a sense of 'Englishness', through raising awareness of the traditions of the past.

Antonia Gransden sees some continuity of the Anglo-Saxon monastic tradition from its origin in seventh-century Northumbria, and argues that historians have exaggerated both the importance of the tenth-century reform and its debt to Continental models. The Anglo-Saxons shared the general medieval tendency to revere the past, and monks in the later Anglo-Saxon period saw the age of Bede as laying the foundations of their own observance and organisation. Robertson says that: "the evidence for the existence of a unified reform movement is, in my opinion, very fragile".

Martin Ryan is also sceptical, pointing out that there is very little evidence of reforming activity in northern England, even though Oswald was Archbishop of York. This may reflect the reformers' dependence on royal support; they needed Edgar's backing to expel secular clergy, and his power was too tenuous in the north to allow this. The most northerly Benedictine abbey was Burton upon Trent. Ryan comments: "Yet if the Benedictine reforms dominate the sources from this period, their wider impact should not be overstressed: large areas of England were affected only minimally, if at all. It was the emergence of small local churches and the development of new systems of pastoral care – processes only imperfectly documented – that would have the more enduring impact and more thoroughgoing effect on religious life in England." Julia Barrow agrees, arguing that the establishment of the Benedictine monasteries was "not necessarily the most important development within the English church of the time"; far more significant numerically was the growth in parish churches. (Note: On the growth of the parish system see Minsters and Parish Churches: The Local Church in Transition 950-1200, edited by John Blair.)

In the view of Catherine Cubitt the reform "has rightly been regarded as one of the most significant episodes in Anglo-Saxon history", which "transformed English religious life, regenerated artistic and intellectual activities and forged a new relationship between church and king". The prosperity of later Anglo-Saxon England was important to its success, and it was underpinned by trade and diplomacy with Continental Europe as well as by religious needs. She acknowledges the reform's limited geographical impact:

But reform brought with it new ways of thinking about the church and its personnel, derived not only from contemporary continental movements but also from the rich pastoral and canonical literature of the Carolingian renaissance. This disseminated ideas concerning the separation of the lay and religious spheres, the distinction between monks and clergy, and enhanced the authority of bishops as both pastoral and political leaders. Ultimately, these ideas were to strike at deeply entrenched features of the early medieval church, such as hereditary control of churches and the right of the clergy to marry.

Cooper emphasises the broad aims of the three leaders:

Although the drive to introduce Benedictine monasticism into the English Church was certainly a key facet of the first generation of the reform movement, the reformers also embraced effective pastoral care, a commitment to education, an expansion of the liturgy that blended continental innovation with English tradition, and an expansion of material production, particularly book production, to support this new liturgy. The reformers were also keen to recover and protect the lands of their communities, which involved not just legal wrangling and securing new donations, but also the fostering of new saints' cults which would strengthen their position. These developments were underpinned by the mutual attachment of the reformed church and the crown, the melding of continental influence with insular continuity and a stronger focus on individual piety and salvation.

== Cultural achievements ==
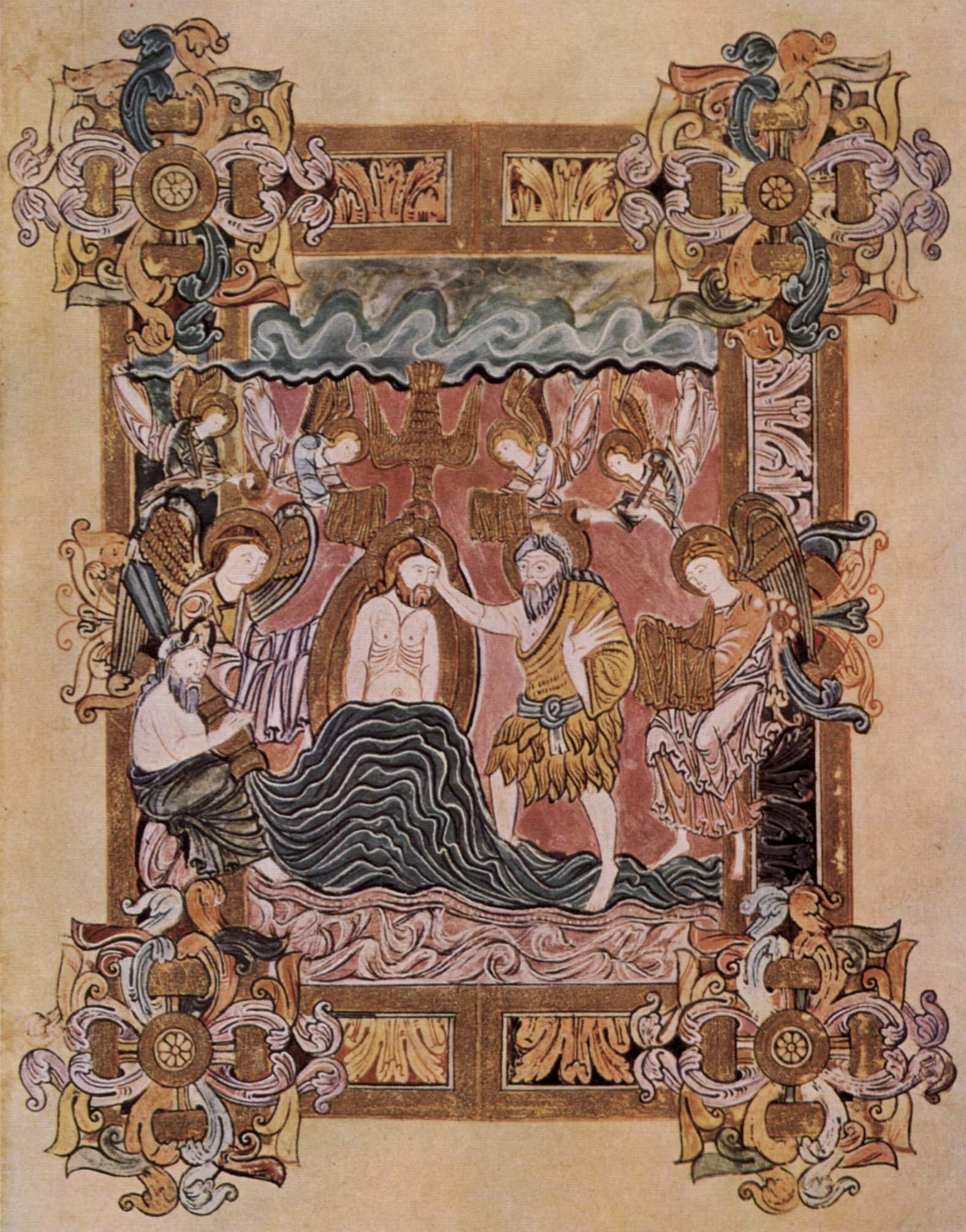
Folio 25r from the Benedictional of St Æthelwold, a miniature of the Baptism of Christ

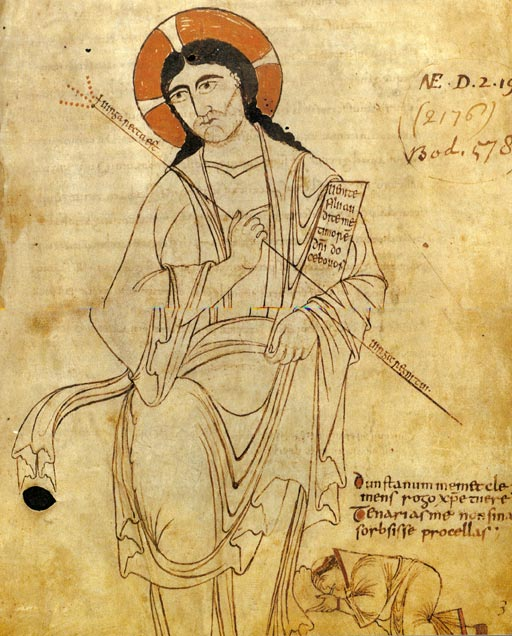
The probable self-portrait of Dunstan kneeling before Christ; detail from the Glastonbury Classbook

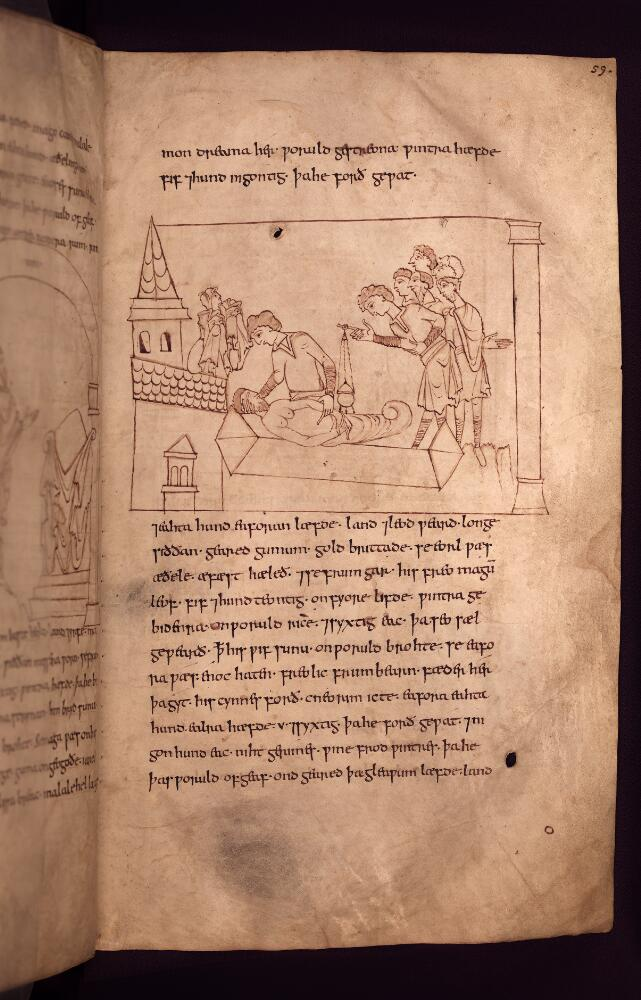
One of many line illustrations in the Junius manuscript

Helmut Gneuss observes that although the reformed monasteries were confined to the south and midlands, "here a new golden age of monastic life in England dawned and brought in its train a renaissance of culture, literature and art". In the view of Mechthild Gretsch: "No school in Anglo-Saxon England has been praised more warmly by its pupils than the school established by Æthelwold at the Old Minster". He established high standards of learning, with skilled exponents of the elaborate and obscure hermeneutic style of Latin which was the house style of the Benedictine reform. He sent monks to Fleury and Corbie Abbeys to learn about liturgical chant, and surviving Winchester tropers (books of liturgical music) include works by Continental and English composers, many of the English ones written in hermeneutic Latin.

Visual art combined new influences from Continental monastic styles with development of earlier English features, and is often described as the "Winchester style" or "school" although this was only one of the centres involved. Although the foundation of new communities declined in the early eleventh century, art continued to flourish as the existing monasteries grew richer. The Benedictional of St Æthelwold (Winchester, probably 970s, now British Library) is recognised as the most important of a group of surviving illuminated manuscripts, lavishly illustrated with extravagant acanthus leaf borders. According to the dedicatory poem, Æthelwold "commanded ... many frames well adorned and filled with various figures decorated with numerous beautiful colours and with gold", and he got what he asked for. It is described by Andrew Prescott as the "outstanding work of art to have survived from this period". According to Barbara Yorke, "The artistic workshops established at Æthelwold's foundations during his lifetime were to continue as influential schools of craftsmen after his death, and had a widespread influence both in England and on the Continent."

As well as lavish illumination, the period saw the development of a distinct English tradition of line drawing in manuscripts, sometimes with the addition of light colour in ink or wash (watercolour), often to reinforce ink in highlighting outlines. This is often divided into two rather different sub-styles. These also developed from Continental styles – one of which, sometimes referred to as the "Utrecht style", was influenced strongly by the presence in Canterbury from around 1000 of the Carolingian Utrecht Psalter, where each psalm is illustrated with a panoramic ink drawing full of tiny figures. The Harley Psalter from Canterbury (probably 1020s) is a copy, with differences in style such as the addition of coloured washes. Dunstan was himself an artist, as were many monks who rose to senior positions, and the earliest datable outline drawing is probably by him, and includes a portrait of him prostrating himself before Christ. This was added to a blank page in an older book, probably before his exile in 956. The other "Winchester" style of drawing can be characterised by detailed and agitated drapery, an effect sometimes taken to excess, but giving animation to figures. The skilled use of line drawing continued to be a feature of English art for centuries, for example in the Eadwine Psalter (Canterbury, probably 1150s) and the work of Matthew Paris, monk of St Albans (c. 1200 – 1259) and his followers.

The very few remains of monastic architecture in the period are supplemented by brief documentary mentions. St Laurence's Church, Bradford-on-Avon appears to represent a unique near-complete monastic church of the period, and the angels in relief were probably part of a large rood cross group. Generally the contemporary sources give much more detail on the valuable treasures in precious metal, rich embroidered cloth, and other materials which the monasteries were able to accumulate, largely from gifts by the elite. The few pieces to survive mostly did so outside England, and include the silver Brussels Cross and a walrus ivory figure from a Crucifixion.

Susan Irvine describes five historical watersheds in the development of the Old English language, the fourth of which is the Benedictine reform, which "led indirectly to the establishment of an Old English 'literary language'". In the late ninth century King Alfred had carried through a programme of translating Latin texts into the vernacular, and almost a century later the monastic reformers revived the project of producing texts in English for teaching. Æthelwold's school at Winchester aimed to establish a standard West Saxon literary language, a programme probably initiated by Æthelwold himself. His most illustrious pupil, Ælfric (c. 950 – c. 1010), who became Abbot of Eynsham, aimed to write in accordance with a consistent grammatical system and vocabulary.

Ælfric, who is described by Claudio Leonardi as "the highest pinnacle of Benedictine reform and Anglo-Saxon literature", shared in the movement's monastic ideals and devotion to learning, as well as its close relations with leading lay people. His works included two series of forty homilies, lives of saints, a Latin grammar in English, and a discussion of trades and occupations. He was an adviser of the king, and an authority on church practice and canon law. Matthew Parker, Queen Elizabeth I's first Archbishop of Canterbury, cited him in support of Protestant doctrines, and his discussion of Eucharistic theory was cited in theological controversies until the nineteenth century.

The reformers were mainly interested in prose rather than poetry, but the bulk of Old English poetry survives in manuscripts of the late tenth and early eleventh centuries, of which the most important are the Beowulf manuscript, Exeter Book, Vercelli Book, and the Junius manuscript. Although the dates of composition of most of this poetry remain uncertain, much of it is probably considerably older than the manuscripts. This is probably because of the interest in vernacular works fostered by the Benedictines. Most surviving vernacular literature was produced by followers of the Benedictine reformers, and written in the standard Old English they championed. Walter Hofstetter observes:

Being a political, religious and cultural centre of unique prestige and influence, Winchester, through the conscious efforts of its monastic school to standardize language, must also have become a factor of prime importance in the evolution of the literary standard in use throughout England in the late Old English period.

Normandy had experienced its own intense monastic reforms, and the Continental leaders of the church immediately after 1066 justified the Conquest by denigrating the pre-Conquest state of the Anglo-Saxon church. Newcomers such as Lanfranc, who became Archbishop of Canterbury in 1070, had no interest in saints venerated by the Anglo-Saxons, and his Constitutiones for Christ Church, Canterbury, show no debt to the Regularis Concordia. However, Anglo-Norman monks soon turned the Anglo-Saxon hagiographical tradition to their own uses, and saints venerated by the Anglo-Saxons regained respect. Monasteries' land and privileges were defended by appealing to pre-Conquest charters, and fabricating fraudulent ones if necessary. In the next generation the two leading historians, Eadmer and William of Malmesbury, saw a pattern of an early Northumbrian peak followed by decline until a revival in the tenth century, and a further decline which reached its nadir on the eve of the Conquest. This scheme, which saw both the tenth century and the post-Conquest as peaks of monastic excellence preceded by periods of decline, satisfied both Norman propaganda and Anglo-Saxon pride, but in Gransden's view it unfairly denigrates the achievements of the periods of so-called decline.

== Historiography ==
Before the twenty-first century, the Benedictine reform dominated history textbooks of the period, and the earlier tenth century and later eleventh received far less attention. According to Wormald: "For English historians, the tenth century is above all one of "Reformation", the enforcement of Benedictine observance upon the religious life". The main sources for the reform are the lives of Dunstan, Oswald and Æthelwold, and this creates the risk of exaggerating the role of these three men at the expense of the many lesser-known men who contributed to the process, and of concentrating on reformed communities at the expense of less rigorous and secular ones. The picture drawn of the reform by Æthelwold and his circle has been dominant, and historians have generally portrayed it favourably. In 2005 John Blair commented: "Ecclesiastical historians' distaste for the lifestyle of secular minsters, which has become less explicit but can even now seem virtually instinctive, reflects contemporary partisanship absorbed into a historiographical tradition which has privileged the centre over the localities, and the ideals of the reformers over the realities and needs of grass-roots religious life." In the twenty-first century, historians have been far more sceptical of the reformers' claims, and defended the contribution of the clerics and local churches. In 1975 David Parsons drew a strong contrast between the radicalism of Æthelwold and the moderation of Dunstan and Oswald, but since then historians have increasingly emphasised the unity of purpose of the three leaders.

Modern historians see clerical institutions in the mid-tenth century, such as Winchester and Canterbury, as flourishing centres of activity in religion, literature and the arts. In Keynes's view: "there had been a steady development throughout the first half of the tenth century, so that when the reform movement gathered momentum, from about 960 onwards, the reformers were able to draw on the traditions and resources of an already flourishing church." Marco Mostert comments: "one has the impression that the life of letters flourished in the unreformed monasteries in ways not dissimilar to that in the Benedictines' monasteries. The monastic reform movement took pride in much that was already in existence."

== Sources ==
- Abels, Richard (1998). Alfred the Great: War, Kingship and culture in Anglo-Saxon England. Harlow, UK: Pearson Education Limited. ISBN 978-0-582-04047-2.
- Abels, Richard (2004). "Byrhtnoth [Brihtnoth] (d. 991)". Oxford Dictionary of National Biography. Oxford University Press. doi:10.1093/ref:odnb/3429. (subscription, Wikipedia Library access or UK public library membership required)
- Backhouse, Janet (1984a). "Literature, Learning and Documentary Sources". In Backhouse, Janet; Turner, D.H.; Webster, Leslie (eds.). The Golden Age of Anglo-Saxon Art, 966–1066. London, UK: British Museum Publications Ltd. pp. 143–69. ISBN 0-7141-0532-5.
- Backhouse, Janet (1984b). "After the Conquest". In Backhouse, Janet; Turner, D.H.; Webster, Leslie (eds.). The Golden Age of Anglo-Saxon Art, 966–1066. London, UK: British Museum Publications Ltd. pp. 194–208. ISBN 0-7141-0532-5.
- Barrow, Julia (1996). "The Community of Worcester, 961-c.1100". In Brooks, Nicholas; Cubitt, Catherine (eds.). St. Oswald of Worcester: Life and Influence. London, UK: Leicester University Press. pp. 84–99. ISBN 978-0-567-34031-3.
- Barrow, Julia (2008a). "The Chronology of the Benedictine 'Reform'". In Scragg, Donald (ed.). Edgar, King of the English 959–975. Woodbridge, UK: The Boydell Press. pp. 211–23. ISBN 978-1-84383-928-6.
- Barrow, Julia (2014). "Ideas and Applications of Reform". In Noble, Thomas. F. X.; Smith, Julia M. H. (eds.). Early Medieval Christianities c. 600 – c. 1100. The Cambridge History of Christianity. Vol. 3. New York, NY: Cambridge University Press. pp. 345–62. ISBN 978-1-107-42364-0.
- Barrow, Julia (2009). "The Ideology of the Tenth-Century English Benedictine 'Reform'". In Skinner, Patricia (ed.). Challenging the Boundaries of Medieval History: The Legacy of Timothy Reuter. Turnhout, Belgium: Brepols. pp. 141–54. ISBN 978-2-503-52359-0.
- Blair, John, ed. (1988a). Minsters and Parish Churches: The Local Church in Transition 950-1200. Oxford, UK: Oxford University Committee for Archaeology. ISBN 978-0-947816-17-9.
- Blair, John (1988b). "Introduction". In Blair, John (ed.). Minsters and Parish Churches: The Local Church in Transition 950-1200. Oxford, UK: Oxford University Committee for Archaeology. pp. 1–19. ISBN 978-0-947816-17-9.
- Blair, John (2005). The Church in Anglo-Saxon Society. Oxford, UK: Oxford University Press. ISBN 978-0-19-921117-3.
- Blair, John; Rippon, Stephen; Smart, Christopher (2020). Planning in the Early Medieval Landscape. Liverpool, UK: Liverpool University Press. ISBN 978-1-78962-116-7.
- Blair, Peter Hunter (2003) [Reprint of 2nd edition of 1977 with a new introduction]. An Introduction to Anglo-Saxon England (3rd ed.). Cambridge, UK: Cambridge University Press. ISBN 0-521-83085-0.
- Brooks, Nicholas (1984). The Early History of the Church of Canterbury. Leicester, UK: Leicester University Press. ISBN 0-7185-1182-4.
- Brooks, Nicholas (1992). "The Career of St Dunstan". In Ramsay, Nigel; Sparks, Margaret; Tatton-Brown, Tim (eds.). St Dunstan : His Life, Times, and Cult. Woodbridge, UK: Boydell Press. pp. 1–23. ISBN 978-0-85115-301-8.
- Cooper, Tracy-Anne (2015). Monk-Bishops and the English Benedictine Reform Movement. Toronto, Canada: Pontifical Institute of Mediaeval Studies. ISBN 978-0-88844-193-5.
- Cubitt, Catherine (1997). "The Tenth-Century Benedictine Reform in England". Early Medieval Europe. 6 (1): 77–94. doi:10.1111/1468-0254.00004. ISSN 0963-9462. S2CID 161695919.
- Cubitt, Catherine (2009). "The Institutional Church". In Stafford, Pauline (ed.). A Companion to the Early Middle Ages: Britain and Ireland c.500- c.1100. Chichester, UK: Wiley-Blackwell. pp. 376–94. ISBN 978-1-118-42513-8.
- Dodwell, C.R. (1982). Anglo-Saxon Art, A New Perspective (US, Cornell, 1985 ed.). Manchester, UK: Manchester University Press. ISBN 0-7190-0926-X.
- Douglas, David (1964). William the Conqueror: The Norman Impact on England. London, UK: Eyre & Spottiswoode. OCLC 231744806.
- Dumville, David (1992). Wessex and England from Alfred to Edgar. Woodbridge, UK: The Boydell Press. ISBN 0-85115-308-9.
- Farmer, David Hugh (1975). "The Progress of the Monastic Revival". In Parsons, David (ed.). Tenth-Century Studies: Essays in Commemoration of the Millennium of the Council of Winchester and the Regularis Concordia. Chichester, UK: Phillimore. pp. 10–19. ISBN 0-85033-179-X.
- Farmer, David Hugh (2011). The Oxford Dictionary of Saints (5th revised ed.). Oxford, UK: Oxford University Press. ISBN 978-0-19-959660-7.
- Gates, Jay Paul (2015). "Preaching, Politics and Episcopal Reform in Wulfstan's Early Writings". Early Medieval Europe. 23 (1): 93–116. doi:10.1111/emed.12089. ISSN 0963-9462. S2CID 153527459.
- Gem, Richard (1984). "Anglo-Saxon Architecture of the 10th and 11th Centuries". In Backhouse, Janet; Turner, D.H.; Webster, Leslie (eds.). The Golden Age of Anglo-Saxon Art, 966–1066. London, UK: British Museum Publications Ltd. pp. 139–42. ISBN 0-7141-0532-5.
- Gneuss, Helmut (1972). "The Origin of Standard Old English and Æthelwold's School at Winchester". Anglo-Saxon England. 1. Cambridge, UK: Cambridge University Press: 63–83. doi:10.1017/S0263675100000089. ISSN 0263-6751. S2CID 161798712.
- Godden, Malcolm (2004). "Ælfric of Eynsham". Oxford Dictionary of National Biography. Oxford University Press. doi:10.1093/ref:odnb/187. (subscription, Wikipedia Library access or UK public library membership required)
- Gransden, Antonia (1992). Legends, Traditions and History in Medieval England. London, UK: The Hambledon Press. ISBN 1-85285-016-7.
- Gretsch, Mechtild (1999). The Intellectual Foundations of the English Benedictine Reform. Cambridge, UK: Cambridge University Press. ISBN 978-0-521-03052-6.
- Gretsch, Mechtild (2003). "Cambridge, Corpus Christi College 57: A Witness to the Early Stages of the Benedictine Reform in England?". Anglo-Saxon England. 32: 111–46. doi:10.1017/S0263675103000073. ISSN 0263-6751. S2CID 162551048.
- Gretsch, Mechtild (2014). "Benedictine Rule, OE". In Lapidge, Michael; Blair, John; Keynes, Simon; Scragg, Donald (eds.). The Wiley Blackwell Encyclopaedia of Anglo-Saxon England (2nd ed.). Chichester, UK: Wiley Blackwell. pp. 64–65. ISBN 978-0-631-22492-1.
- Helvétius, Anne-Marie; Kaplan, Michel (2014). "Asceticism and its Institutions". In Noble, Thomas. F. X.; Smith, Julia M. H. (eds.). Early Medieval Christianities c. 600 – c. 1100. The Cambridge History of Christianity. Vol. 3. New York, NY: Cambridge University Press. pp. 275–98. ISBN 978-1-107-42364-0.
- Hofstetter, Walter (1988). "Winchester and the Standardization of Old English Vocabulary". Anglo-Saxon England. 17. Cambridge, UK: Cambridge University Press: 139–61. doi:10.1017/S0263675100004051. ISSN 0263-6751. S2CID 162644253.
- Insley, Charles (2009). "Southumbria". In Stafford, Pauline (ed.). A Companion to the Early Middle Ages: Britain and Ireland c.500- c.1100. Chichester, UK: Wiley-Blackwell. pp. 322–40. ISBN 978-1-118-42513-8.
- Irvine, Susan (2014). "Beginnings and Transitions: Old English". In Mugglestone, Lynda (ed.). The Oxford History of English (Updated ed.). Oxford, UK: Oxford University Press. pp. 39–74. ISBN 978-0-19-966016-2.
- John, Eric (1982). "The Age of Edgar". In Campbell, James (ed.). The Anglo-Saxons. Harmondsworth, UK: Penguin Books. pp. 160–91. ISBN 0-14-014395-5.
- Karkov, Catherine E. (2011). The Art of Anglo-Saxon England. Woodbridge, UK: The Boydell Press. ISBN 978-1-84383-628-5.
- Keynes, Simon (1984). "Introduction". In Backhouse, Janet; Turner, D.H.; Webster, Leslie (eds.). The Golden Age of Anglo-Saxon Art, 966–1066. London, UK: British Museum Publications Ltd. pp. 11–16. ISBN 0-7141-0532-5.
- Keynes, Simon (2008). "Edgar Rex Admirabilis". In Scragg, Donald (ed.). Edgar, King of the English 959–975. Woodbridge, UK: The Boydell Press. pp. 3–59. ISBN 978-1-84383-928-6.
- Lapidge, Michael (1988). "Æthelwold as Scholar and Teacher". In Yorke, Barbara (ed.). Æthelwold: His Career and Influence. Woodbridge, UK: The Boydell Press. pp. 89–117. ISBN 978-0-85115-705-4.
- Lapidge, Michael (1992). "B. and the Vita S. Dunstani". In Ramsay, Nigel; Sparks, Margaret; Tatton-Brown, Tim (eds.). St Dunstan : His Life, Times, and Cult. Woodbridge, UK: Boydell Press. pp. 247–59. ISBN 978-0-85115-301-8.
- Lapidge, Michael (2004). "Dunstan [St Dunstan] (d. 988), Archbishop of Canterbury". Oxford Dictionary of National Biography. Oxford University Press. doi:10.1093/ref:odnb/8288. (subscription, Wikipedia Library access or UK public library membership required)
- Lapidge, Michael (2014). "Monasticism". In Lapidge, Michael; Blair, John; Keynes, Simon; Scragg, Donald (eds.). The Wiley Blackwell Encyclopaedia of Anglo-Saxon England (2nd ed.). Chichester, UK: Wiley Blackwell. pp. 327–29. ISBN 978-0-631-22492-1.
- Leonardi, Claudio (1999). "Intellectual Life". In Reuter, Timothy (ed.). The New Cambridge Medieval History. Vol. III. Cambridge, UK: Cambridge University Press. pp. 186–211. ISBN 0-521-36447-7.
- McKitterick, Rosamond (1999). "The Church". In Reuter, Timothy (ed.). The New Cambridge Medieval History. Vol. III. Cambridge, UK: Cambridge University Press. pp. 130–62. ISBN 0-521-36447-7.
- Molyneaux, George (2015). The Formation of the English Kingdom in the Tenth Century. Oxford, UK: Oxford University Press. ISBN 978-0-19-871791-1.
- Morris, Rosemary (2014). "The Problems of Property". In Noble, Thomas. F. X.; Smith, Julia M. H. (eds.). Early Medieval Christianities c. 600 – c. 1100. The Cambridge History of Christianity. Vol. 3. New York, NY: Cambridge University Press. pp. 327–44. ISBN 978-1-107-42364-0.
- Mostert, Marco (2010). "Relations Between Fleury and England". In Rollason, David; Leyser, Conrad; Williams, Hannah (eds.). England and the Continent in the Tenth Century. Turnhout, Belgium: Brepols. pp. 185–208. ISBN 978-2-503-53208-0.
- Nightingale, John (1996). "Oswald, Fleury and Continental Reform". In Brooks, Nicholas; Cubitt, Catherine (eds.). St. Oswald of Worcester: Life and Influence. London, UK: Leicester University Press. pp. 23–45. ISBN 978-0-567-34031-3.
- Planchart, Alejandro (1977). The Repertory of Tropes at Winchester. Vol. 1. Princeton, New Jersey: Princeton University Press. ISBN 978-0-691-09121-1.
- Pope, Janet M. (1994). Harper-Brill, Christopher (ed.). "Monks and Nobles in the Anglo-Saxon Monastic Reform". Anglo-Norman Studies: Proceedings of the Battle Conference. XVII. Woodbridge, UK: The Boydell Press: 165–80. ISSN 0954-9927.
- Pratt, David (2007). The Political Thought of King Alfred the Great. Cambridge, UK: Cambridge University Press. ISBN 978-0-521-12644-1.
- Prescott, Andrew (1988). "The Text of the Benedictional of St Æthelwold". In Yorke, Barbara (ed.). Bishop Æthelwold: His Career and Influence. Woodbridge, UK: The Boydell Press. pp. 119–47. ISBN 978-0-85115-705-4.
- Robertson, Nicola (2005). "Dunstan and Monastic Reform: Tenth-Century Fact or Twelfth-Century Fiction?". Anglo-Norman Studies: Proceedings of the Battle Conference. XXVIII. Woodbridge, UK: The Boydell Press: 153–67. ISSN 0954-9927.
- Ryan, Martin J. (2013). "Conquest, Reform and the Making of England". In Higham, Nicholas J.; Ryan, Martin J. (eds.). The Anglo-Saxon World. New Haven, Connecticut: Yale University Press. pp. 284–322. ISBN 978-0-300-12534-4.
- Salvador-Bello, Mercedes (2008). "The Edgar Panegyrics in the Anglo-Saxon-Chronicle". In Scragg, Donald (ed.). Edgar, King of the English 959–975. Woodbridge, UK: The Boydell Press. pp. 252–72. ISBN 978-1-84383-928-6.
- Stafford, Pauline (1989). Unification and Conquest: A Political and Social History of England in the Tenth and Eleventh Centuries. London, UK: Edward Arnold. ISBN 0-7131-6532-4.
- Stenton, Frank (1971). Anglo-Saxon England (3rd ed.). Oxford, UK: Oxford University Press. ISBN 978-0-19-280139-5.
- Stephenson, Rebecca (December 2009). "Scapegoating the Secular Clergy: the Hermeneutic Style as a Form of Monastic Self-Definition". Anglo-Saxon England. 38. Cambridge, UK: Cambridge University Press: 101–35. doi:10.1017/S0263675109990081. ISSN 0263-6751. S2CID 170841963.
- Thacker, Alan (1992). "Cults at Canterbury: Relics and Reform under Dunstan and his Successors". In Ramsay, Nigel; Sparks, Margaret; Tatton-Brown, Tim (eds.). St Dunstan : His Life, Times, and Cult. Woodbridge, UK: Boydell Press. pp. 221–45. ISBN 978-0-85115-301-8.
- Thacker, Alan (1996). "Saint-Making and Relic Collecting by Oswald and his Communities". In Brooks, Nicholas; Cubitt, Catherine (eds.). St. Oswald of Worcester: Life and Influence. London, UK: Leicester University Press. pp. 244–68. ISBN 978-0-567-34031-3.
- Tinti, Francesca (May 2015). "Benedictine Reform and Pastoral Care in Late Anglo- Saxon England". Early Medieval Europe. 23 (2). Wiley Blackwell: 229–51. doi:10.1111/emed.12098. ISSN 0963-9462. S2CID 161532299.
- Turner, D. H. (1984). "Illuminated Manuscripts". In Backhouse, Janet; Turner, D.H.; Webster, Leslie (eds.). The Golden Age of Anglo-Saxon Art, 966–1066. London, UK: British Museum Publications Ltd. pp. 46–87. ISBN 0-7141-0532-5.
- Webster, Leslie (1984). "Metalwork and Sculpture". In Backhouse, Janet; Turner, D.H.; Webster, Leslie (eds.). The Golden Age of Anglo-Saxon Art, 966–1066. London, UK: British Museum Publications Ltd. pp. 88–138. ISBN 0-7141-0532-5.
- Webster, Leslie (2012). Anglo-Saxon Art. London, UK: British Museum Press. ISBN 978-0-7141-2809-2.
- Williams, Ann (1982). "Princeps Merciorum Gentis: the Family, Career and Connections of Ælfhere, Ealdorman of Mercia, 956-83". Anglo-Saxon England. Cambridge, UK: Cambridge University Press: 143–72. ISSN 0263-6751.
- Wilson, David M. (1984). Anglo-Saxon Art: From The Seventh Century To The Norman Conquest. Woodstock, NY: Thames and Hudson (US edn. Overlook Press). ISBN 978-0-87951-976-6.
- Woodman, D. A. (December 2013). "'Æthelstan A' and the Rhetoric of Rule". Anglo-Saxon England. 42. Cambridge, UK: Cambridge University Press: 217–48. doi:10.1017/S0263675113000112. ISSN 0263-6751. S2CID 159948509.
- Wormald, Patrick (1988). "Æthelwold and his Continental Counterparts: Contact, Comparison, Contrast". In Yorke, Barbara (ed.). Bishop Æthelwold: His Career and Influence. Woodbridge, UK: The Boydell Press. pp. 13–42. ISBN 978-0-85115-705-4.
- Wormald, Patrick (2004). "Alfred [Ælfred] (848/9–899), King of the West Saxons and of the Anglo-Saxons". Oxford Dictionary of National Biography. Oxford University Press. doi:10.1093/ref:odnb/183. (subscription, Wikipedia Library access or UK public library membership required)
- Yorke, Barbara (1988a). "Introduction". In Yorke, Barbara (ed.). Bishop Æthelwold: His Career and Influence. Woodbridge, UK: The Boydell Press. pp. 1–12. ISBN 978-0-85115-705-4.
- Yorke, Barbara (1988b). "Æthelwold and the Politics of the Tenth Century". In Yorke, Barbara (ed.). Bishop Æthelwold: His Career and Influence. Woodbridge, UK: The Boydell Press. pp. 65–88. ISBN 978-0-85115-705-4.
- Yorke, Barbara (2008). "The Women in Edgar's Life". In Scragg, Donald (ed.). Edgar, King of the English 959–975. Woodbridge, UK: The Boydell Press. pp. 143–57. ISBN 978-1-84383-928-6.
