= Wulfstan the Cantor =

Anglo-Saxon monk and scribe

Wulfstan the Cantor (c. 960 – early 11th century), also known as Wulfstan of Winchester, was an Anglo-Saxon monk of the Old Minster, Winchester. He was also a writer, musician, composer and scribe. Wulfstan is most famous for his hagiographic work Vita S. Aethelwoldi.

== Life ==
Very little is known about Wulfstan's life. The date of his birth is unknown, but personal references within his poem Narratio metrica de S. Swithuno suggest he was a child at the time of St. Swithun’s canonization in 971. These references have led scholars to believe that Wulfstan was born in about 960 and was given as a child to the Old Minster, where he spent his mature life. At the Old Minster, Wulfstan studied under Æthelwold of Winchester, about whom he wrote his Vita S. Aethelwoldi. Wulfstan became a monk and a priest; he then rose to become a precentor, and hence is often referred to in contemporary sources as Wulfstan Cantor. As precentor, Wulfstan would have been responsible for leading chants, recruiting and training the choir, and composing poems and hymns, among other things. In addition to these musical responsibilities, Wulfstan worked as a scribe and as a hagiographic author. The day of his death, 22 July, is recorded in a New Minster calendar, but not the year. His latest datable writing is his Vita S. Aethelwoldi, which was composed no earlier than 996. He presumably died some time in the early 11th century.

== Writings ==
=== Vita S. Aethelwoldi ===
Wulfstan's most famous work, Vita S. Aethelwoldi (The Life of St. Aethelwold), tells of the life and miracles of St. Aethelwold, Bishop of Winchester. The work is 46 chapters long, elaborately composed using complex sentences and displays a familiarity with many earlier hagiographic writings. The Vita was written very soon after Aethelwold was canonized, which took place on 10 September 996. Some scholars believe the Vita was written to coincide with this event.

The work contains no statement of authorship, but is undoubtedly the writing of Wulfstan. Not only do later sources such as William of Malmesbury attribute the work to Wulfstan, the piece bears striking stylistic similarities to Wulfstan's other writings. For example, in Wulfstan's poem Narratio metrica de S. Swithuno, several phrases and even large sections of text, including two entire chapters from Vita S. Aethelwoldi, appear.

The Vita was written for the purpose of recording the miraculous powers of St. Aethelwold in order to prove that Aethelwold was a vessel of divinity who could be appealed to through prayer as an intermediary to God. Wulfstan's Vita follows a format similar to other hagiographic works of the time. The piece appears to have been largely inspired by Lantfred of Winchester's Translatio et miracula S. Swithuni, which was completed in about 975. Wulfstan's work uses a similar style of prose to that of Bede’s Vita S. Cuthberti, which, like the Vita S. Aethelwoldi, contains 46 chapters. Some events described in Wulfstan’s Vita are very similar to events described in Sulpicius Severus’ Vita S. Martini. It is likely Wulfstan drew heavily on these authors in constructing his Vita.

=== Narratio metrica de S. Swithuno ===
Wulfstan's poem Narratio metrica de S. Swithuno is a hexametrical version of Lantfred of Winchester's Translatio et miracula S. Swwithuni (c.975). Wulfstan's poem was composed between 992 and 994, but was put into its final form after the composition of Vita S. Aethelwoldi in 996, when two chapters of Wulfstan's prose from the Vita were turned into verse and incorporated into the poem. The poem consists of 3386 lines, making it the longest Anglo-Latin poem surviving today. It is also the most accomplished Anglo-Latin poem in terms of metrical style, illustrating Wulfstan's skill as a poet. The poem describes the elevation of St. Swithun and is also thought to be the original source of the well-known British weather lore that if it rains on St. Swithun's Day, 15 July, it will rain for the next 40 days.

=== Breuiloquium de omnibus sanctis ===
Breuiloquium de omnibus sanctis is a recently discovered poem by Wulfstan. The poem bears Wulfstan's name and is thus very significant to scholars as it provides a firm basis for the analysis of Wulfstan's poetic style and technique, allowing it to be used as a template for the attribution of other works to Wulfstan. The poem is long, consisting of 669 hexameters preceded by a prologue of 20 lines of epanaleptic couplets and ending with an epilogue of 27 hexameters. Breuiloquium de omnibus sanctis is a metrical version of an anonymous Carolingian sermon on All Saints called Legimus in ecclesiasticis historiis. The sermon was very popular in Wulfstan's time and was widely circulated. Wulfstan's poem begins by describing Pope Boniface IV’s explanation of the Pantheon in Rome, and then goes on to list various categories of saints venerated by the Church and commemorated on All Saints' Day.

=== De tonorum harmonia ===
De tonorum harmonia, also known as Breuiloquium super musica, is a lost work by Wulfstan. Little is known about the piece, but the majority of information comes from a 15th-century anonymous commentary entitled De musica. The author of De musica makes four references to the work of a figure named ‘Wulstan’, which is likely Wulfstan. The references reveal that De tonorum harmonia, or Breuiloquium super musica as it is sometimes called, was concerned with the theory rather than the practice of music. Wulfstan is cited as an authority on musical theory. Although now lost, Wulfstan's De tonorum harmonia is of unique value in that it is the only known work on music composed by an Anglo-Saxon.

=== Other works ===
Wulfstan is known to have written liturgical materials relating to the Cult of St. Aethelwold. Wulfstan was active in promoting the Cult of St. Aethelwold and as precentor would have been responsible for providing various prayers, tropes, and hymns needed for the cult's celebrations. He is also thought to have composed various hexametrical rubrics, tropes and sequences within the musical manuscripts the “Winchester Tropers”. Many of these works attributed to Wulfstan bear no explicit indication of authorship and attribution depends mainly on stylistic arguments.

== Legacy ==
=== Understanding of St. Aethelwold ===
Wulfstan's Vita S. Aethelwoldi is the principal source for knowledge of St. Aethelwold, who was one of the champions of the Monastic Reform movement in Winchester. Though other works about St. Aethelwold exist, Wulfstan's is the longest and contains the largest amount of information.

As is very clear from the Vita S. Aethelwoldi, Wulfstan was the primary figure in effecting the canonization of St. Aethelwold and was also instrumental in establishing and promoting the Cult of St. Aethelwold. The promotion of the cult was dependent on the publication of a suitable Vita text to display Aethelwold's sanctity and miraculous powers, as well as the composition of the necessary hymns and prayers for the liturgical commemoration of the saint on his feast-day. As precentor, Wulfstan fulfilled these duties and solidified Aethelwold's position as an honoured Anglo-Saxon saint.

=== Influence on later writing ===
Many of Wulfstan's writings enjoyed wide circulation throughout Medieval England, especially his Vita S. Aethelwoldi, which had an influence on later hagiographic writing. In fact, scholars believed that Wulfstan's Vita was one of the most widely read of all pre-Conquest Anglo-Latin saints' lives.

Wulfstan's Vita is thought to have inspired Aelfric of Eynsham's Vita S. Aethelwoldi, although scholars debate which text was written first. The similarities between the two texts indicate that one author was drawing on the other's text, but there is debate as to whether Aelfric is summarizing Wulfstan or Wulfstan is expanding on Aelfric. Aelfric's version has 29 chapters and can be precisely dated to the year 1006. Aelfric is well known for abridging the texts of other authors, which again leads recent scholars to believe Aelfric's Vita S. Aethelwoldi is a summary of Wulfstan's. Regardless of whose Vita was composed first, Aelfric's Vita was not as widely circulated as Wulfstan's, and therefore, the vast majority of subsequent writing about Aethelwold is based on Wulfstan's version.

In addition to Aelfric, many other hagiographic writers drew on Wulfstan's Vita S. Aethelwoldi in composing their own works. The work of Goscelin of Saint-Bertin, a professional hagiographer writing at the end of the 11th century, contains miracle stories that are very similar to, and appear to be inspired by, those contained in Wulfstan's Vita. Orderic Vitalis (1075–1142) authored a reworking of Aethelwold's life based on Wulfstan. In the 12th century, the author of the Libellus Aethelwoldi or The Book of Aethelwold drew on the information contained in Wulfstan's Vita, as did the anonymous author of Chronicon monasterii de Abingdon. The Peterborough Chronicle of Huge Candidus incorporates several chapters of Wulfstan's Vita. Even as late as the 15th century works such as the poem The South English Legendary, which contains a “Life of Adelwold”, utilized Wulfstan's work. Wulfstan's Narratio metrica de S. Swithuno, De tonorum harmonia, and many of the hymns attributed to him, were also widely read and referenced by other writers in southern England, although not to the extent of his Vita.

== Bibliography ==
- Lapidge, M.; Winterbottom, M. (1991), Wulfstan of Winchester: The Life of St. Aethelwold (Latin and English), Clarendon Press
- John, Eric (1994). "Wulfstan of Winchester's The Life of St. Aethelwold". Catholic Historical Review. 80 (3): 575–584.
- Winterbottom, Michael (1972), Three Lives of English Saints (Latin only), Hunter Rose Company
- York, Barbara (1994). "Wulfstan of Winchester". English Historical Review. 109 (434): 1244–1245.
