= Regularis Concordia (Winchester) =

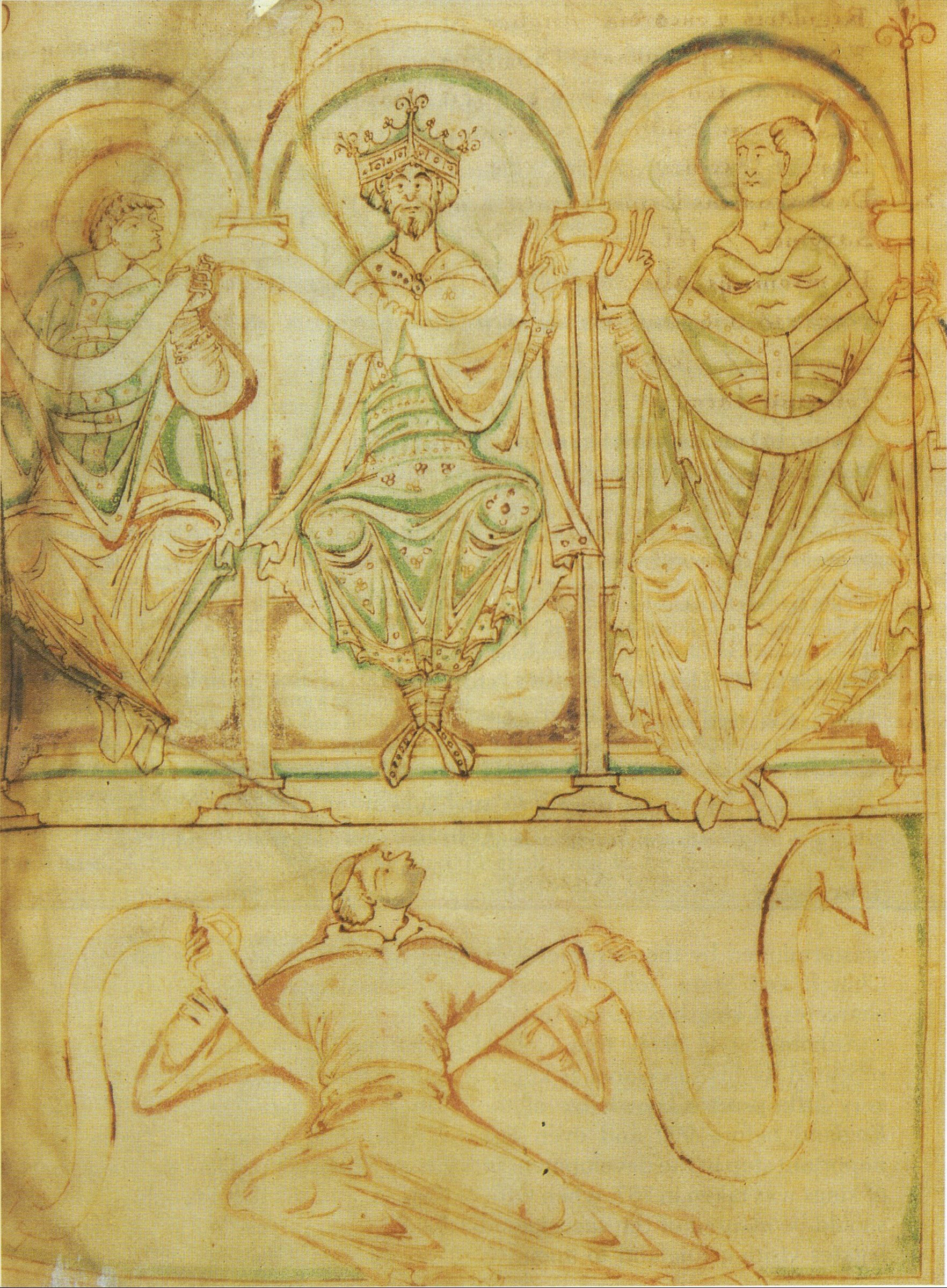
King Edgar seated between St Æthelwold and St Dunstan. From an eleventh-century manuscript of the Regularis Concordia (British Library, Cotton, Tiberius A III, f2v).

The Regularis Concordia was the most important document of the English Benedictine Reform, sanctioned by the Council of Winchester in about 973.

The document was compiled by Æthelwold, who was aided by monks from Fleury and Ghent. A synodal council was summoned to construct a common rule of life to be observed by all monasteries. The document served as a rule for how monastic life should be performed and included monastic rituals like the procedure for the election of bishops that differed from Continental practice, and which led to a predominantly monastic episcopacy.

== Content ==
One of the larger topics found within the manuscript is the Forward to the Harmony of the Rule, which is meant to apply to the monks and nuns of the entire nation that was ruled under King Edgar. This section of the document proclaimed that every religious house in the kingdom was to follow the rules prescribed in the rest of the manuscript. This included how the monastic "office" was to be performed; "office" includes vigils, lauds, and prayers and is a practice that was established in the fifth century. The prescriptions for monastic "office" are specific; for example, it includes the specific liturgical song to be performed during the mandated labor hours that were required of the monks. The portion of the manuscript dedicated to the rites of Holy Week and Easter are the most detailed. This is where the introduction of the quem quaeritis is introduced, and is now credited to be the introduction of theatrical ritual. The Regularis also creates the specific pattern and order that bells should be rung in for Masses and holidays.

== Historical context ==
Under Edgar the Peaceful (r. 959–975), England experienced a period of peace and a revival of monasticism. Æthelwold of Winchester improved and expanded the Rule of Saint Benedict and wrote the Regularis Concordia as a result of Edgar's rule.

== Monastic reform in the 10th century ==
The urgency for monastic reform was set in motion by the Rule of Saint Benedict coming into popularity in the mid 10th century. According to its proponents, King Edgar, Æthelwold of Winchester, Dunstan and Oswald of Worcester, monasticism had died in the 9th century and The Rule of Saint Benedict was the key for revitalization. They elevated this text as the ideal form of monastic culture and uniform way of life.

=== Æthelwold of Winchester ===
Æthelwold of Winchester is known as the main contributor to the original Regularis Concordia manuscript, which became an official document of 10th Century monastic reform in Anglo-Saxon England. Æthelwold was also the sole translator of Rule of Saint Benedict, which was included in the Regularis Concordia. He was an appropriate leader for the passion needed to helm the English Benedictine Reform. He had a reputation for being "as terrible as a lion" to the rebellious and for zealously fighting corruption in the church. Æthelwold successfully reformed the monasticism of France into Southern England

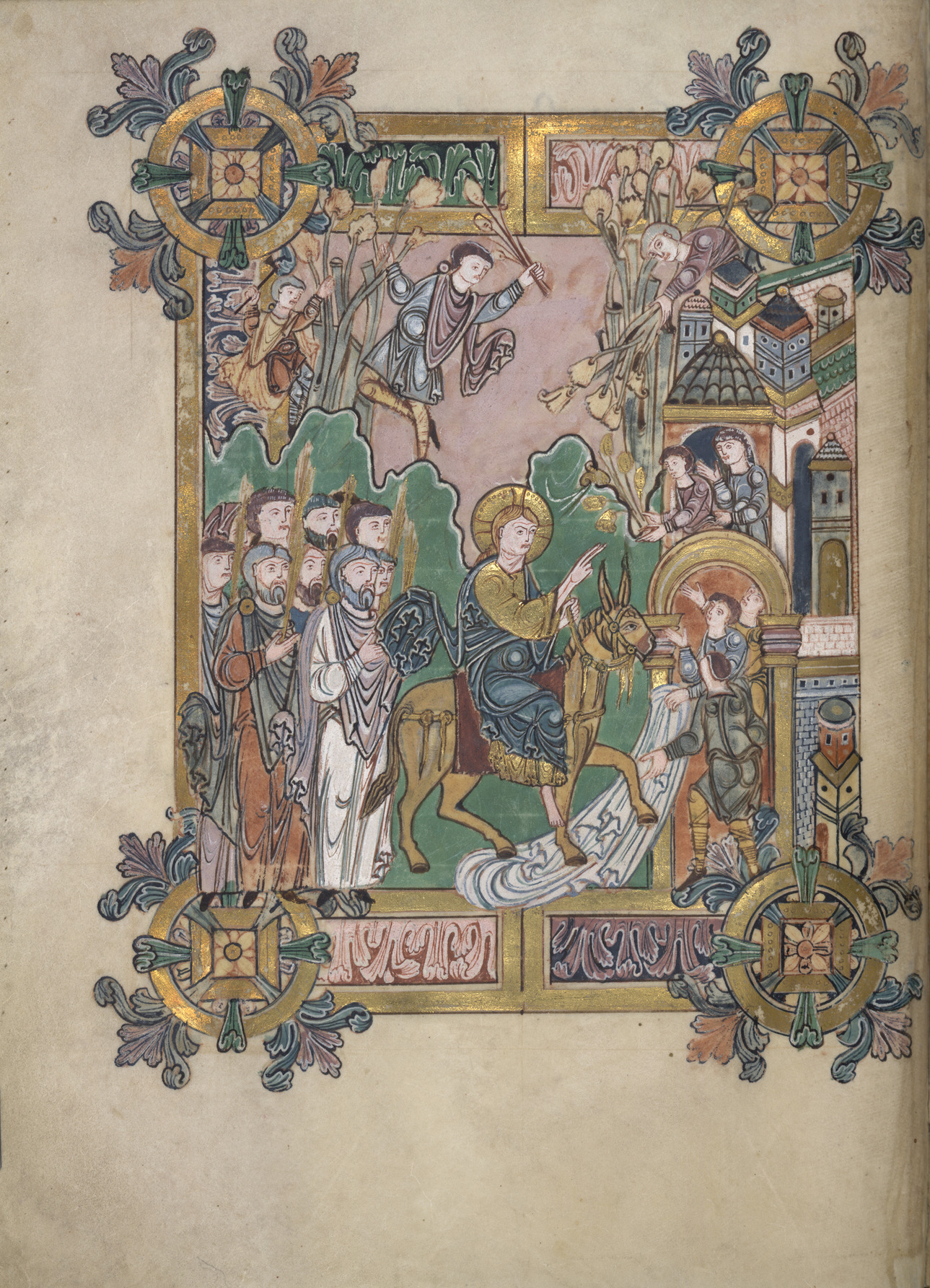
The Entry into Jerusalem from the Benedictional of Saint Æthelwold (British Library)

=== Dunstan ===
Dunstan was an abbot of Glastonbury and is said to be the predecessor of Ethewold. Dunstan is responsible for a call for monastic revival in his own monastery and an internal codification of religious rule that was said to have expanded into the revival that resulted in the 10th century. He ejected corrupted clerics from his monastery despite alleged threats. Dunstan became an icon for morality in his community, and that image translated into his effect on the revival in general.

== Theatrical ritual ==
The earliest example of theatrical ritual is found in the Regularis Concordia with the rule of the divine service, referred to as the quem quaeritis. This rule includes the oldest documented theatrical recital of alternating song to be performed the night before Easter. The Regularis states that the importance of this visual ritual was to aid those who could not read or understand Latin in the understanding of the ritual. The Latin quote below describes: "An alternating song between the three women approaching the grave, and the angel watching on it, shall be recited; the friar who sings the words of the angel is to take his seat, clad in an alb and with a palm-twig in his hand, in a place representing the tomb; three other friars, wearing hooded capes and with censers in their hands, are to approach the tomb at a slow pace, as if in quest of something"

Quem quaeritis in sepulchro, o Christicolae? Jesum Nazarenum cruifixum, o caelicolae. Non est hic, surrexit, sicut praedixerat. Ite, nuntiate, quia surrexit de sepulchro.

== Manuscripts ==
Dom Thomas Symons' 1953 English translation of the Regularis Concordia used both extant manuscripts:

- London, BL, MS Faustina B III, f. 159r-198r.
- London, BL, MS Tiberius A III, f. 3-27.

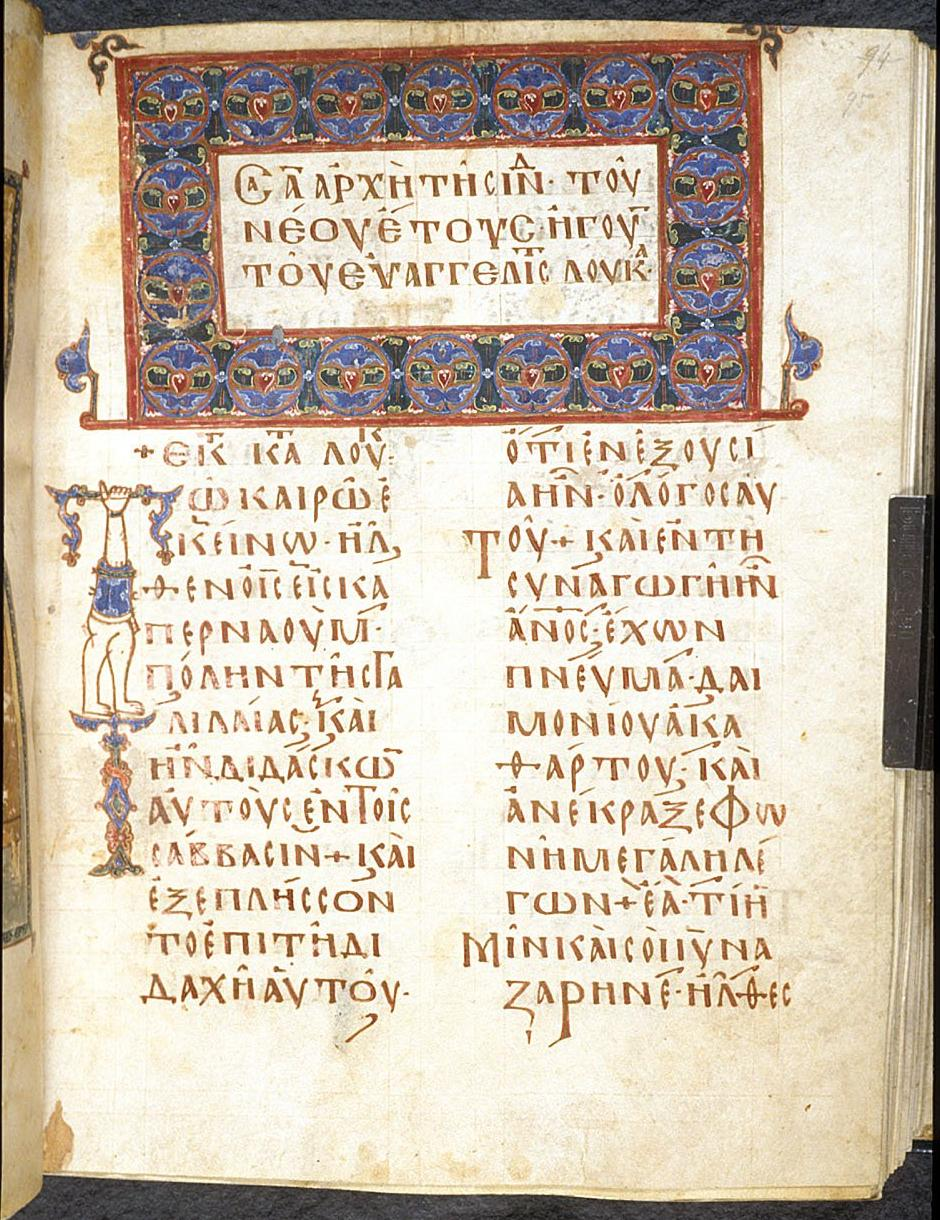
Lectionary 183

== Primary sources ==
Regularis Concordia

- Regularis Concordia, ed. and tr. D.T. Symons, Regularis Concordia Anglicae Nationis Monachorum Sanctimonialiumque. The Monastic Agreement of the Monks and Nuns of the English Nation. London, 1953.

Ælfric's Letter to the monks of Eynsham

- Letter to the Monks of Eynsham, ed. and tr. C. A. Jones, Ælfric’s Letter to the Monks of Eynsham. Cambridge Studies in Anglo-Saxon England 24. Cambridge, 1998.

Old English versions

1. A continuous Old English interlinear gloss in BL, MS Tiberius A III f. (Faustina), ed. Lucia Kornexl, Die Regularis Concordia und ihre altenglische Interlinearversion. Edition mit Einleitung und Kommentar. Münchener Universitäts-Schriften 17. Munich, 1993.
2. Two fragments of Old English prose translations:
  1. Old English translation of §§ 36–43 in London, BL, MS Tiberius A III, f. 174-7 (previously preceding the Latin text of MS Faustina B III), ed. A. Schröer, "De consuetudine monachorum." Englische Studien 9 (1886): 290–96.
  2. Old English translation of §§ 14–19 in Cambridge, CCC, MS 201 (Part A), pp. 1–7, ed. J. Zuptiza, "Ein weiteres Bruchstück der Regularis Concordia in altenglischer Sprache." ASNSL 84 (1890): 1-24.
