= Leofric Missal =

10th-century illuminated manuscript from England

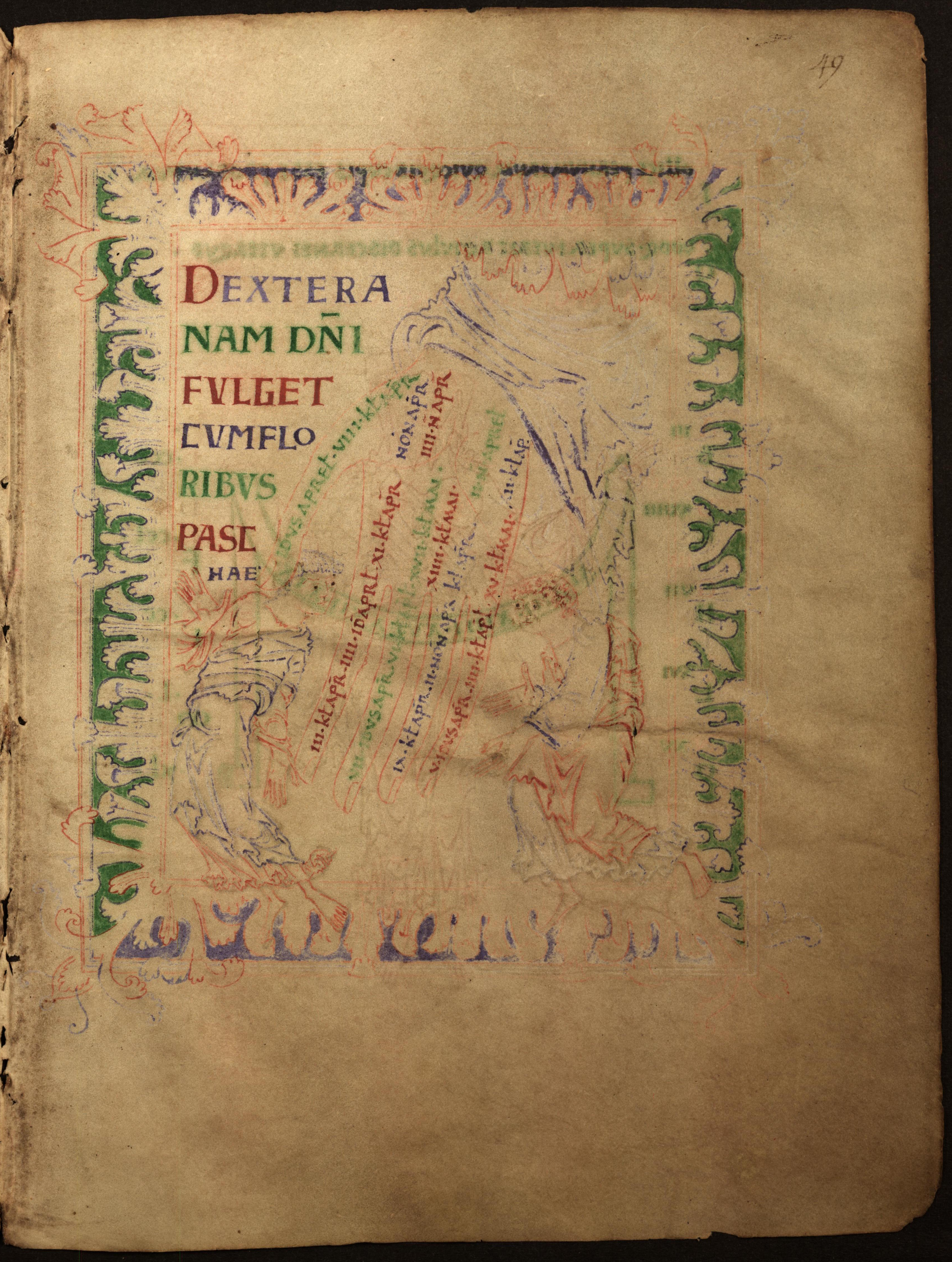
- Paschal Hand illustration from the Leofric Missal
- Date: 10th and 11th century
- Provenance: Lotharingia and England
- State of existence: Surviving
- Manuscript(s): Bodleian Library Bodley 579
- Genre: Missal

The Leofric Missal is an illuminated manuscript, not strictly a conventional missal, from the 10th and 11th century, now in the Bodleian Library at Oxford University where it is catalogued as MS Bodl. 579.

== Origins and history ==
The origins of the manuscript date to around 900 AD when a sacramentary was produced in Lotharingia. Anglo-Saxon parts were added to the manuscript during the 10th and 11th centuries, including a calendar of church feasts as well as other information on celebrating the Mass, and some legal records in Old English. The last of these additions date to the episcopate of Leofric, who was Bishop of Exeter from 1050 to 1072.

The Missal gained its name from the dedication on the first folio (f) that the book was given by Leofric to his cathedral. This is written in an 11th-century scribal hand, that has been identified as originating at Exeter Cathedral.

== Contents ==
The Missal consists of three basic sections. The first, named "A" by one of the editors of the manuscript, F. E. Warren, is the sacramentary, probably created in the last half of the ninth century. It contains a large initial (f 154 verso (v)) with human and animal heads and interlace that is thought to have been added in England in the first half of the 10th century.

Warren called the second section "B" and identified it as 21 folios of material relating to a calendar, other computus-related material, and four pages of illustrations on both sides of folios 49 and 50. These illustrations, which are full-page and mostly drawings in several colours of ink, were added around 970 in England in a different style to the initial in section A. They are an early instance of the influence from the school of Reims that was part of the formation of the Winchester style through works like the Utrecht Psalter. Their style has been compared to the slightly earlier Winchester manuscript, the Benedictional of St. Æthelwold, though the miniatures there are mostly fully painted. Folio 49r depicts the Hand of God giving the paschal cycle, followed by pages showing standing figures of Vita and Mors ("Life" and "Death"), illustrating the Apuleian Sphere, a method of divination to discover if a patient would live or die, that ultimately originated in Coptic Egypt. Folio 50 v has diagrams with decorations and a bust in a roundel showing the calculation of the date of Easter. There is decoration, in one case a full border, of acanthus foliage, and all the drawings are badly faded. The entire "B" section appears to have originated at Glastonbury Abbey, and seems to have formed a coherent whole. The lack of mention of Edward the Martyr, who died in 979, would place the addition of this material before that date.

The rest of the manuscript, which is named "C" by Warren, is a collection of a variety of texts written by over thirty different scribes throughout the 10th and 11th centuries. The information relates to the Mass, manumissions, and other notes and were all written by English scribes. The "C" information is not in one coherent block, as it is not only added at the beginning and the end of the manuscript, but also occupies blank spaces throughout the other two sections.

Warren suggested that section "A" was brought by Leofric to England in the 1040s when Leofric returned from the Continent. Warren felt that Leofric then added "B", which was a pre-existing manuscript that Leofric acquired, and "C", which were notes that Leofric had accumulated. Other scholars, however, including Robert Desham, feel that section "A" was in England by about 940. Desham then argues that "B" was specifically composed before 979 to bring a foreign and older sacramentary up to date. "C", according to Desham, was composed over time during the 10th and 11th centuries, and thus Leofric had little hand in the creation of the Missal.
