= Æthelwold of Winchester =

Bishop of Winchester from 963 to 984

Saint Æthelwold
- Bishop of Winchester
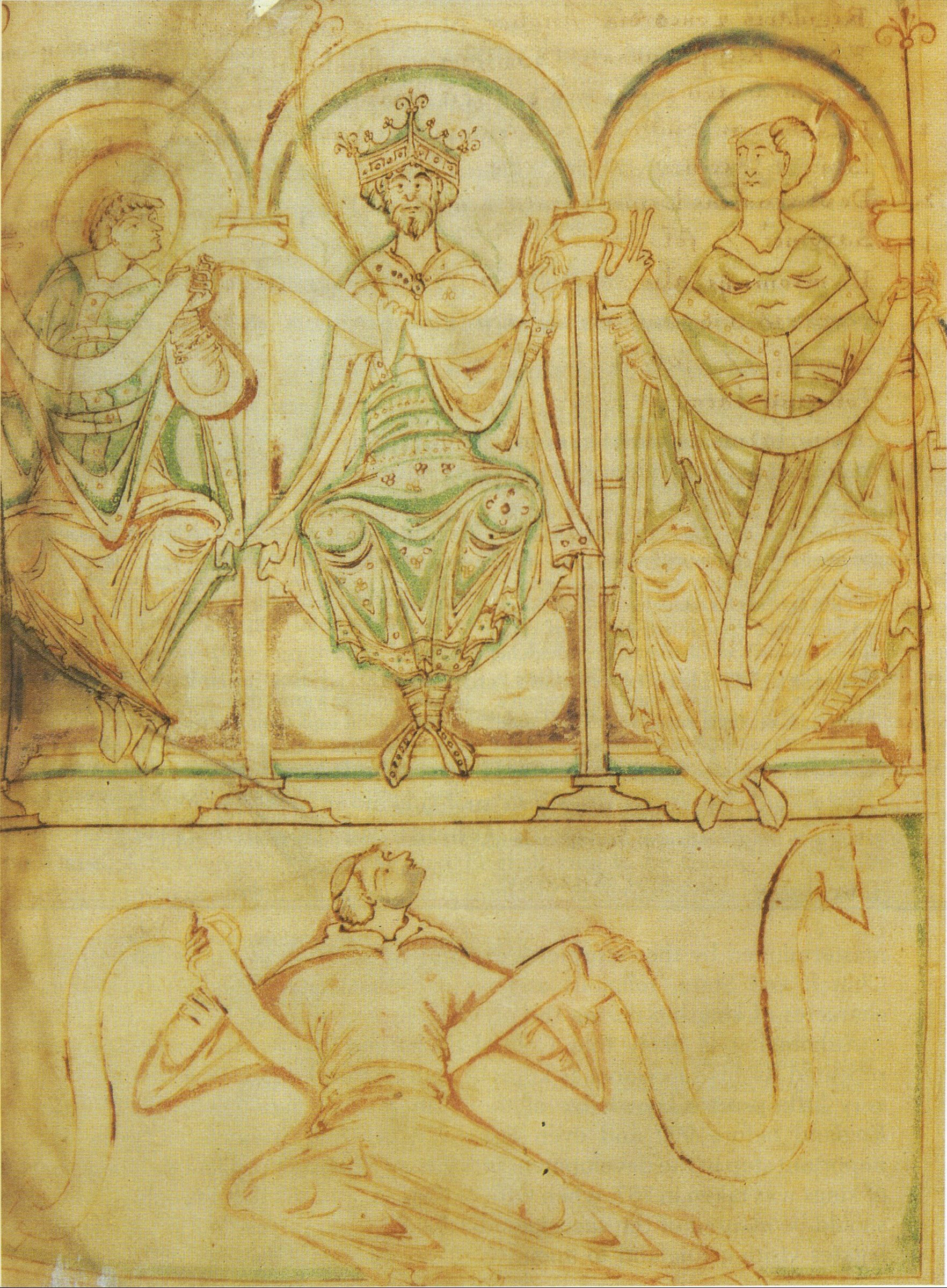
- King Edgar seated between St. Æthelwold, Bishop of Winchester, and St. Dunstan, Archbishop of Canterbury. From an eleventh-century manuscript of the Regularis Concordia.
- Appointed: 29 November 963
- Term ended: 1 August 984
- Predecessor: Beorhthelm of Winchester
- Successor: Ælfheah II

Orders
- Consecration: 29 November 963

Personal details
- Born: between 904 and 909 Winchester
- Died: 1 August 984 Beddington, Surrey, England
- Denomination: Christian

Sainthood
- Feast day: 1 August; 19 May (POCSP)
- Venerated in: Catholic Church; Eastern Orthodox Church; Anglican Church

Æthelwold of Winchester (also Aethelwold and Ethelwold, 904/9 – 984) was Bishop of Winchester from 963 to 984 and one of the leaders of the tenth-century monastic reform movement in Anglo-Saxon England.

Monastic life had declined to a low ebb in England in the ninth century, partly because of the ravages caused by Viking attacks, and partly because of a preference for secular clergy, who were cheaper and were thought to serve the spiritual needs of the laity better. Kings from Alfred the Great onwards took an interest in the Benedictine rule, but it was only in the middle of the tenth century that kings became ready to commit substantial funds to its support. Æthelwold became the leading propagandist for the monastic reform movement, although he made enemies by his ruthless methods, and he was more extreme in his opposition to secular clergy than his fellow reformers, Saint Dunstan and Oswald of Worcester. He is nevertheless recognised as a key figure in the reform movement, who also made a major contribution to the revival of learning and the arts. He was an important political figure, backing Æthelred the Unready against Edward the Martyr, and playing a major advisory role during Æthelred's minority.

Æthelwold freed slaves and helped the poor. During the great famine of the 10th century, he sold the treasures and ornaments of Abingdon Abbey to buy food for the poor. Furthermore, he used his own assets and episcopal authority to manumit—or set free—many serfs and slaves, earning the title "friend of the poor."

== Early life ==
Æthelwold was born to noble parents in Winchester. From the late 920s he served in a secular capacity at the court of King Athelstan, and according to Æthelwold's biographer, Wulfstan, "he spent a long time in the royal burh there as the king's inseparable companion, learning much from the king's witan that was useful and profitable to him". The king arranged for him to be ordained a priest by Ælfheah the Bald, Bishop of Winchester, on the same day as Saint Dunstan. After a period in the late 930s studying under Ælfheah at Winchester, Æthelwold moved to Glastonbury Abbey, where Dunstan had been made abbot. Here Æthelwold studied grammar, metrics and patristics, subsequently being made dean. During the reign of King Eadred (946–955), Æthelwold wished to travel to Europe to learn more about the monastic life, but Eadred refused permission, and instead appointed him abbot of the former monastic site of Abingdon Abbey, which was then served by secular priests. The years he spent in Abingdon were extremely productive, and he undertook the building of a church, the rebuilding of the cloister and the establishment at Abingdon of the Benedictine Rule.

When Eadred died, he was succeeded by his nephew, Eadwig, who drove Eadred's chief advisor, Dunstan, into exile. However, Æthelwold attended Eadwig's court in at least some of the years of his reign, 955–59. The future King Edgar had been taught from boyhood by Æthelwold, who evidently inspired his pupil to take an interest in the rule of Saint Benedict. When Eadwig died, Æthelwold naturally backed Edgar's succession. He seems to have been in the personal service of King Edgar in 960–963, as he wrote many of the charters of this period.

== Bishop of Winchester ==
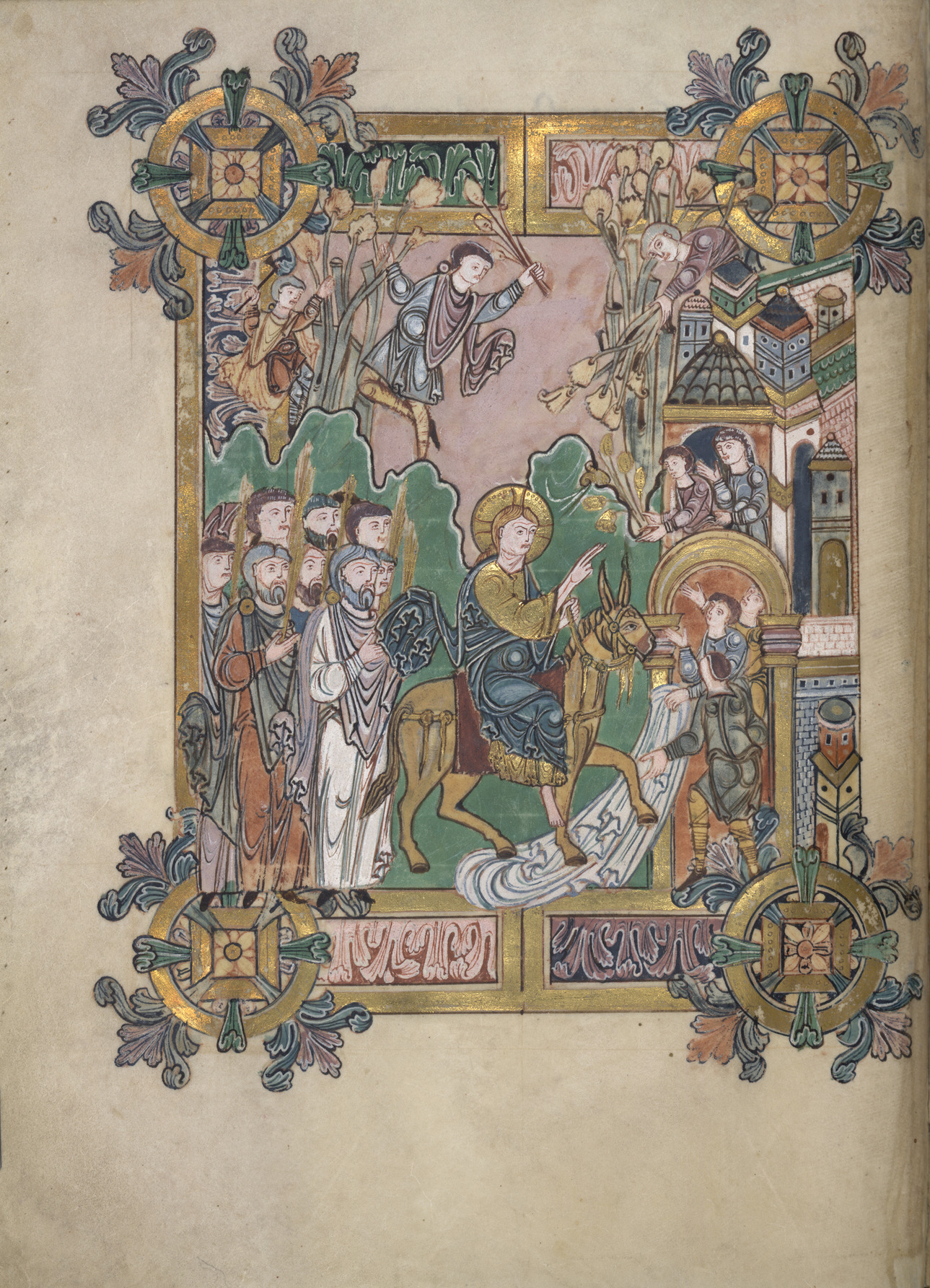
The Entry into Jerusalem from the Benedictional of Saint Æthelwold (British Library)

On 29 November 963, Æthelwold was consecrated Bishop of Winchester, and the following year, with the connivance of King Edgar and the support of an armed force led by a royal official, he had the clerics of the Winchester Old and New Minsters expelled and replaced by monks from Abingdon. The king had sought the permission of the pope for the expulsion the previous autumn. Between 964 and 971, Æthelwold refounded monasteries at Chertsey, Milton Abbas, Peterborough, Ely and Thorney, and the Nunnaminster nunnery in Winchester. He was also zealous in recovering land which he believed had once belonged to religious communities and subsequently been alienated, and if necessary charters were forged to prove claims to title.

Æthelwold was one of the principal advocates for the Benedictine reform movement during Edgar's reign, the author of all the major works of propaganda produced in England. He had the strong support of Edgar and his wife, Ælfthryth, and his works emphasise the role of Edgar, who he saw as Christ's representative, in restoring the monasteries. He envisaged a major role for Edgar in supervising monasteries, and for Queen Ælthryth supervising Benedictine nunneries. However, he was more extreme in his espousal of monasticism than Dunstan and Oswald, the other great leaders of monasticism in the reign of King Edgar. They followed continental practice in maintaining both monks and secular priests in their households, and did not follow Æthelwold in his dramatic expulsions of secular clerks and replacement by monks. Æthelwold links the terms 'filth' and 'clergy' several times in his writings, regarding them (like other Benedictines) as impure and unfit to serve altars or engage in any form of divine service, because many of them were married and they did not follow a monastic rule.

To Æthelwold's admirers, the epithets "father of monks" and "benevolent bishop" summarize his character as reformer and friend of Christ's poor; though he suffered much from ill-health, his life as scholar, teacher, prelate and Royal counsellor was ever austere, and he was said to be "terrible as a lion" to the rebellious, yet "gentler than a dove" to the meek. He is said to have written a treatise on the circle and to have compiled the "Regularis Concordia".

The Benedictines were greatly superior to the secular clergy in their learning and their schools. Æthelwold personally taught the older pupils at Winchester, and their works show that they regarded him with great respect and affection. His surviving works in both Latin and Old English show that he was a great scholar, and his vernacular writings are believed to have played an important role in the development of Standard Old English. Some of the wealth he accumulated was used to rebuild churches, and he was also a major patron of ecclesiastical art, although unfortunately none of his works survive, and only written accounts remain. The artistic workshops he established continued to be influential after his death, both at home and abroad.

A century later Æthelwold had acquired a great reputation as a goldsmith, and was credited with the production of a range of metal objects at Abingdon, including many figures and objects in precious metal, bells and even a pipe organ. While his later, disreputable successor at Abingdon Spearhafoc clearly was, like Dunstan, a significant artist, that Wulfstan's contemporary Life of Æthelwold mentions him undertaking other forms of manual work, in the gardens and in building, but nothing about metalwork, suggests this legend was a later elaboration, though one that shows the high status of goldsmithing at the time. Æthelwold was certainly bishop during the period when the Winchester school of manuscript illumination reached its peak, and the most important surviving manuscript of the school, the Benedictional of Saint Æthelwold (British Library), was commissioned by him. He also rebuilt the Old Minster at Winchester, completed in 980.

== Political role ==
Æthelwold also played an important political role. When the succession became an issue late in Edgar's reign, Æthelwold supported the claim of Æthelred, the son of his major patron, Ælfthryth, whereas Dunstan and Oswald appear to have supported Edgar's son by an earlier wife, Edward the Martyr, who succeeded to the throne. After Edward was murdered in 978, Æthelwold seems to have played a major advisory role in Æthelred's minority. It is significant that it was only after Æthelwold's death in 984 that Æthelred started acting against the interests of some of the reformed monastic houses. One victim was Abingdon Abbey, and in a charter restoring its privileges in 993 the king acknowledged that Æthelwold's passing had deprived the country "of one whose industry and pastoral care ministered not only to my interest but also to that of all the inhabitants of the country."

== Death and reputation ==
Æthelwold died on 1 August 984 at Beddington in Surrey. He was buried in the crypt of the Old Minster at Winchester, but twelve years later Ælfhelm, a citizen of Wallingford, claimed to have been cured of blindness by visiting Æthelwold's tomb. This was taken as the necessary sign for his formal recognition as a saint, and his body was translated from the crypt to the choir. By the 12th century, Abingdon Abbey had acquired an arm and a leg.

One of Æthelwold's pupils, Wulfstan of Winchester, wrote a biography which seems to have played a major role in promoting his cult, and in about 1004 Ælfric, another disciple and abbot of Eynsham, abridged Wulfstan's work in Latin and Old English. However, the Æthelwold of Wulfstan's life inspired respect rather than devotion, and his cult never seems to have achieved great popularity. Wulfstan's saint is a formidable authoritarian, who, for instance, commands a monk to show his devotion by plunging his hand into a pot of boiling stew. He has a reputation for ruthless insensitivity which is not shared by the other tenth-century monastic reformers. His importance to the reform movement has always been appreciated, but the range of his contributions to scholarship has only been recognised in recent years.

Æthelwold's liturgical feast is kept on 1 August.

== Bibliography ==
- Anglo-Saxons.net Charter S567 accessed on 5 September 2007
- Barrow, Julia, The Ideology of the Tenth-Century English Benedictine 'Reform', in Patricia Skinner (ed.), Challenging the Boundaries of Medieval History: The Legacy of Timothy Reuter, 2009, Brepols, ISBN 978-2-503-52359-0
- Catholic Encyclopedia, 1909: St. Ethelwold
- Ryan, Patrick W. R. (1909). "St. Ethelwold" . In Herbermann, Charles (ed.). Catholic Encyclopedia. Vol. 5. New York: Robert Appleton Company.
- Catholic Online Saints and Angels: St. Ethelwold accessed on 5 September 2007
- Dodwell, C. R. (1982). Anglo-Saxon Art: A New Perspective. Manchester, UK: Manchester University Press. ISBN 978-0-7190-0861-0.
- Foot, Sarah (2011) Æthelstan: The First King of England, Yale University Press
- Fryde, E. B.; Greenway, D. E.; Porter, S.; Roy, I. (1996). Handbook of British Chronology (Third revised ed.). Cambridge: Cambridge University Press. ISBN 0-521-56350-X.
- Lambertson, Reader Isaac. Commemoration of Our Father among the Saints Æthelwold, Bishop of Winchester
- Walsh, Michael A New Dictionary of Saints: East and West London: Burns & Oates 2007 ISBN 0-86012-438-X
- Wulfstan of Winchester (1991), Life of St. Æthelwold, Lapidge, M. & Winterbottom, M. (ed. and trans.), OUP
- Yorke, Barbara, Æthelwold, Online Oxford Dictionary of National Biography, 2004

Christian titles
Preceded by Beorhthelm of Winchester	Bishop of Winchester; 963–984	Succeeded by Ælfheah II
