= Beorhthelm of Winchester =

10th-century Bishop of Winchester

Beorhthelm
- Bishop of Winchester
- Appointed: after 959
- Term ended: before late 963
- Predecessor: Ælfsige I
- Successor: Æthelwold I

Personal details
- Denomination: Christian

Beorhthelm (Note: Also Brihthelm - there is some evidence that he was the same Brihthelm who was Bishop of Selsey between 953 and 963.) was Bishop of Winchester sometime between 959, when the previous bishop became Archbishop of Canterbury, and late 963, when the next bishop was consecrated.

== Citations ==
Christian titles
Preceded by Ælfsige I	Bishop of Winchester	Succeeded by Æthelwold I
