= Benedictional of St Æthelwold =

10th-century illuminated manuscript

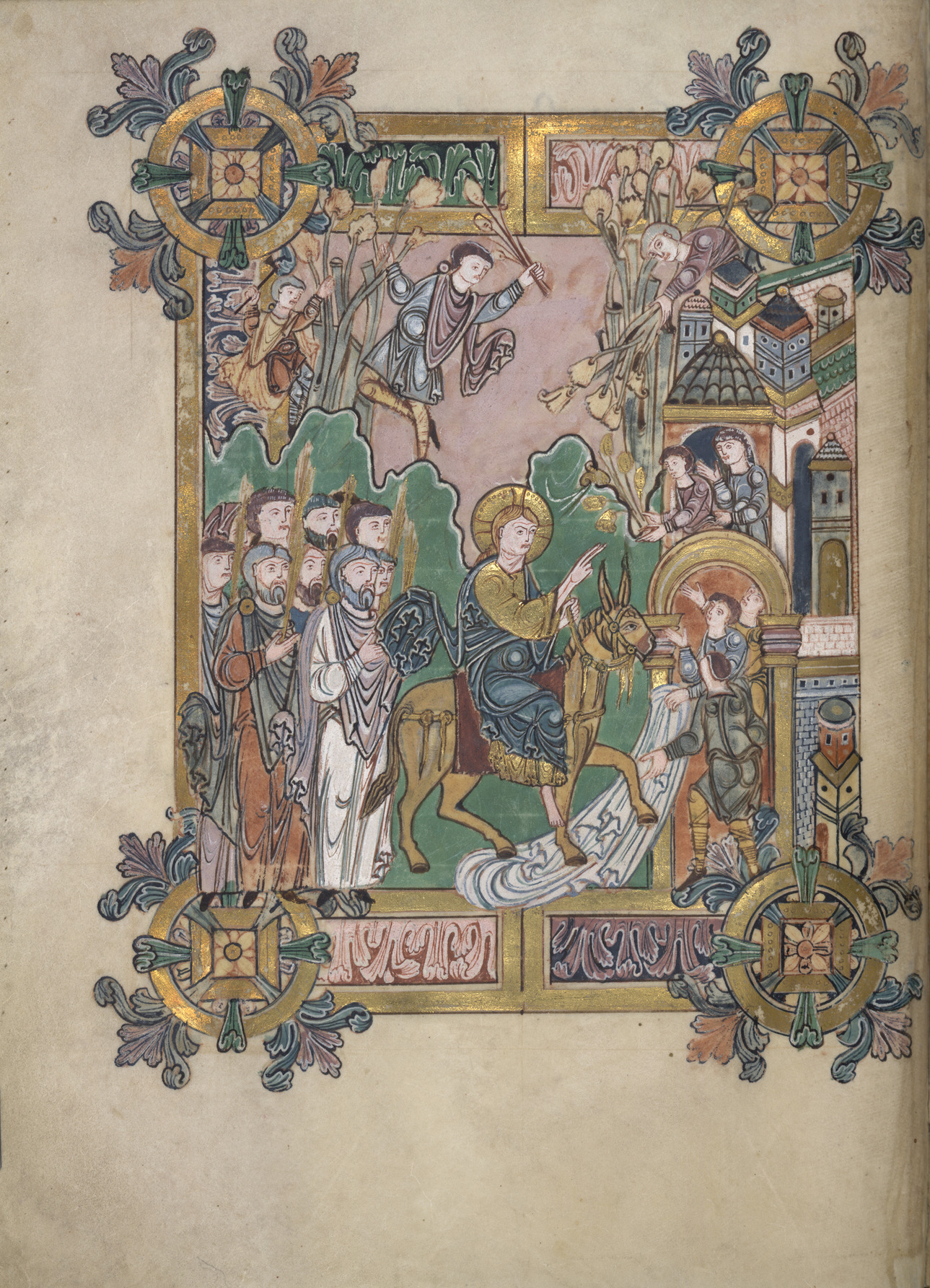
Christ's entry into Jerusalem, f. 45v

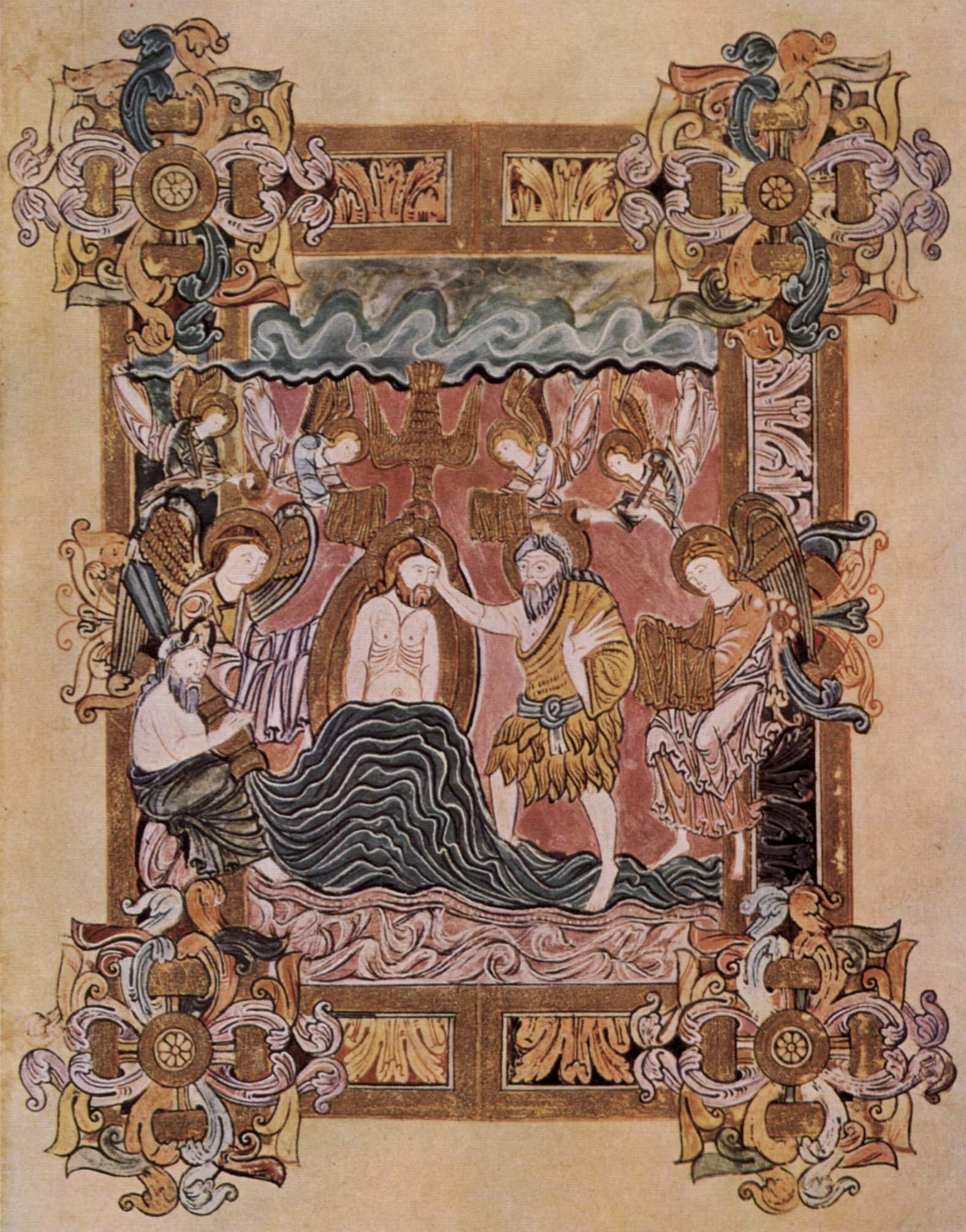
Folio 25r from the Benedictional of St. Æthelwold contains a miniature of the Baptism of Christ (colour poorly reproduced).

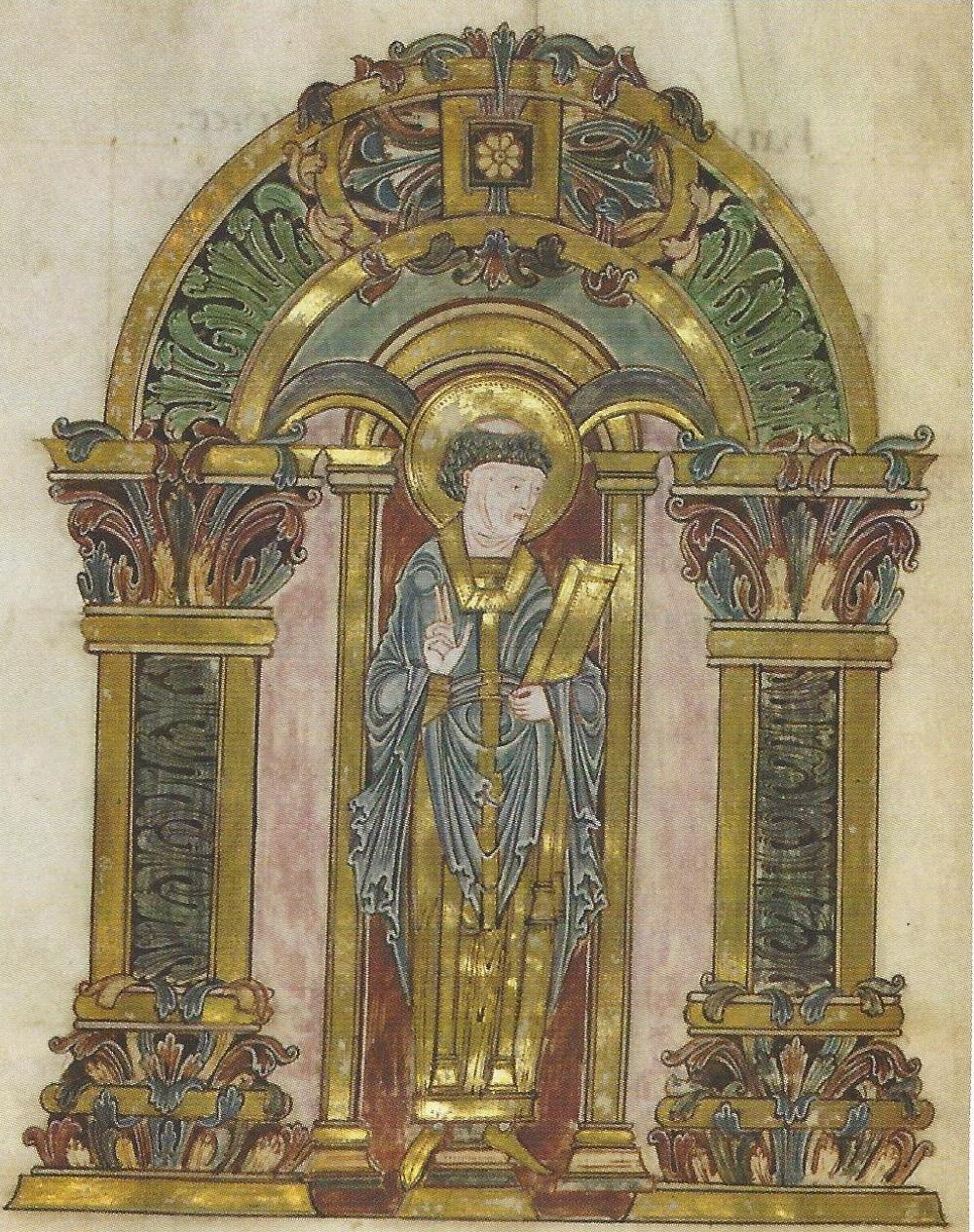
Saint Swithun

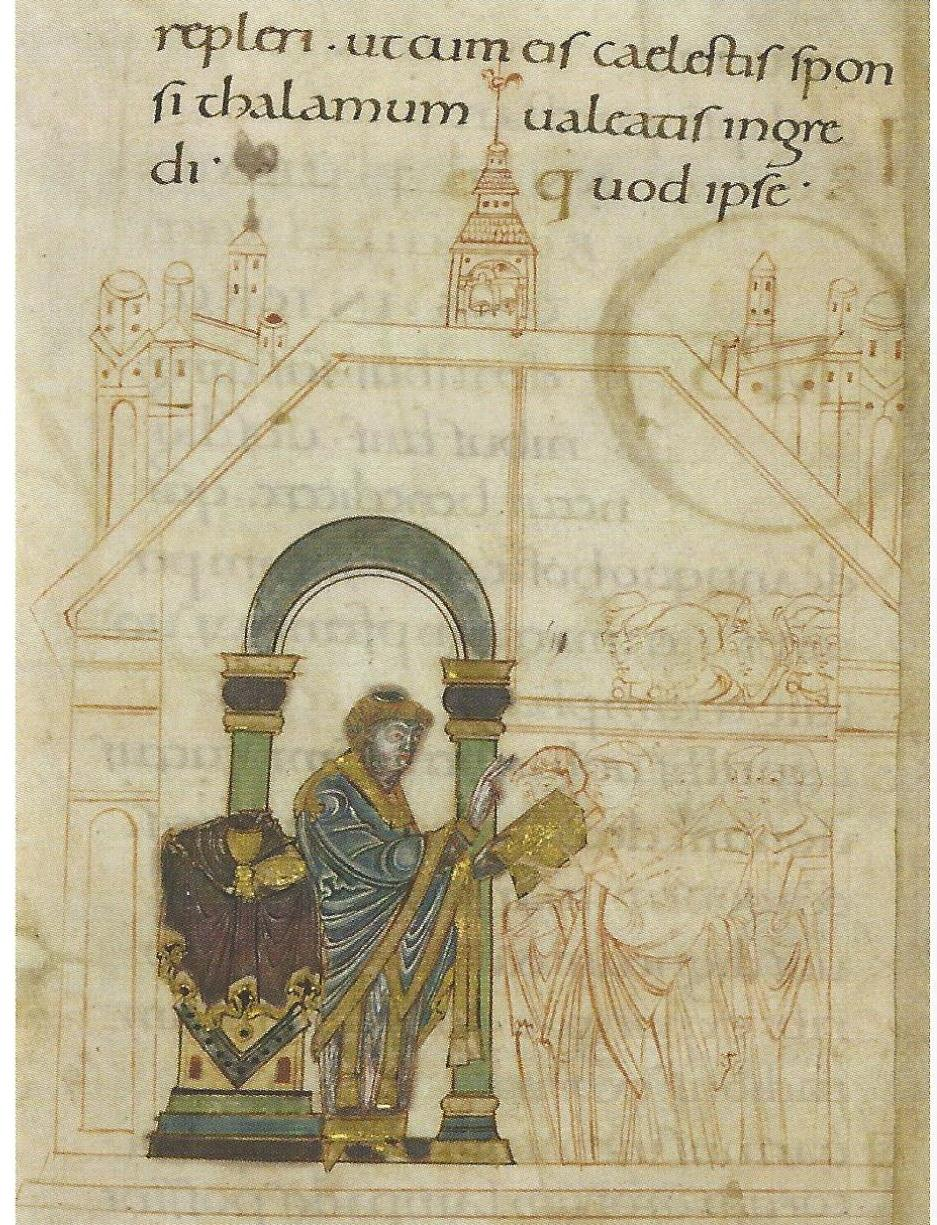
Dedication of a church, probably representing Æthelwold, f. 118v

The Benedictional of St Æthelwold (London, British Library, Add MS 49598) is a 10th-century illuminated benedictional, the most important surviving work of the Anglo-Saxon Winchester School of illumination. It contains the various pontifical blessings used during Mass on the differing days of the ecclesiastical year, along with a form for blessing the candles used during the Feast of the Purification. The manuscript was written by the monk Godeman at the request of Æthelwold, Bishop of Winchester.

The manuscript is decorated on an extremely lavish scale, and is generally accepted as the masterpiece of late Anglo-Saxon illumination, and of the Winchester style. There are 28 full-page miniatures, 19 other framed pages, and two full-page historiated initials, one framed. The programme is incomplete, and there were probably intended to be a further 15 full-page miniatures and more framed pages. As with most manuscripts, the illuminations, apart from the gold and silver, were painted in watercolour.

A wide range of colours, many overpainted to achieve a different effect, and much gold and silver are used. The style of the miniatures is characterized by brilliant colour and exuberant acanthus ornament. Influences from Carolingian illumination can be seen in the book's elegant Caroline script and its paintings which draw upon the schools of Ada and Reims; Ada in the "statuesque poses, the crumpled veils, and the diagonal folds of draperies", Reims in the eddying clouds. A strong sense of Englishness shines through, however, in the "exhilarating dance of colour and line" and the agile brushwork which frees the figures to "glide effortlessly over the frames".

== History ==
The manuscript was made sometime between 963 and 984, probably during the 970s. Folios 4r and 5v contain a Latin inscription which describes how the manuscript came to be made.

A bishop, the great Æthelwold, whom the Lord had made patron of Winchester, ordered a certain monk subject to him to write the present book . . . He commanded also to be made in this book many frames well adorned and filled with various figures decorated with many beautiful colours and with gold. This book the Boanerges aforesaid caused to be indited for himself . . . Let all who look upon this book pray always that after the term of the flesh I may abide in heaven Û Godeman the scribe, as a suppliant, earnestly asks this

Æthelwold I was Bishop of Winchester from 29 November 963 until his death on 1 August 984, so the manuscript was produced between those dates. The benediction for the Feast of St. Swithun mentions miracles performed by Swithun, which lead H. A. Wilson to conclude that the benediction could not have been composed before the translation of Swithun's relics on 15 July 971. St. Ætheldreda is given a prominence in the manuscript that would indicate that the manuscript was not made until after 970 when Æthelwold had refounded the abbey of Ely, which had been founded by Ætheldreda. R. Deshman has argued that the drawings added to the Leofric Missal (Oxford, Bodleian Library, MS Bodley 579) in about 979 were influenced by the illuminations of the Benedictional of St. Æthelwold, meaning that it was probably produced before 979.

The scribe, Godeman, was a monk at the Old Minster at Winchester and may have belonged to the group of monks from Abingdon that Æthelwold placed in Winchester Cathedral to replace the Canons that had been there previously. In 973 Æthelwold placed Godeman in the new foundation at Thorney, either as Æthelwold's representative with Æthelwold being the nominal abbot, or as abbot in his own right. After Æthelwold's death Godeman continued as Abbot of Thorney. The Red Book of Thorney states that Godeman was Æthelwold's personal chaplain.

It is assumed that the Benedictional remained at Winchester after Æthelwold's death. However, the binding was reinforced with a 15th-century list of relics at Hyde Abbey, which may mean the manuscript was at Hyde Abbey during some part of the Middle Ages. In the 17th century it was in the possession of Henry Compton, who was Master of the Hospital of St. Cross, Winchester, and who later became Bishop of Oxford (1674) and then Bishop of London (1675). Bishop Compton died in 1713 and the manuscript passed to his nephew, Gen. Hatton Compton, Lieutenant of the Tower. General Compton gave the manuscript to William Cavendish, 2nd Duke of Devonshire and it was purchased by the British Museum Library from Andrew Cavendish, 11th Duke of Devonshire in 1957.

== Text ==
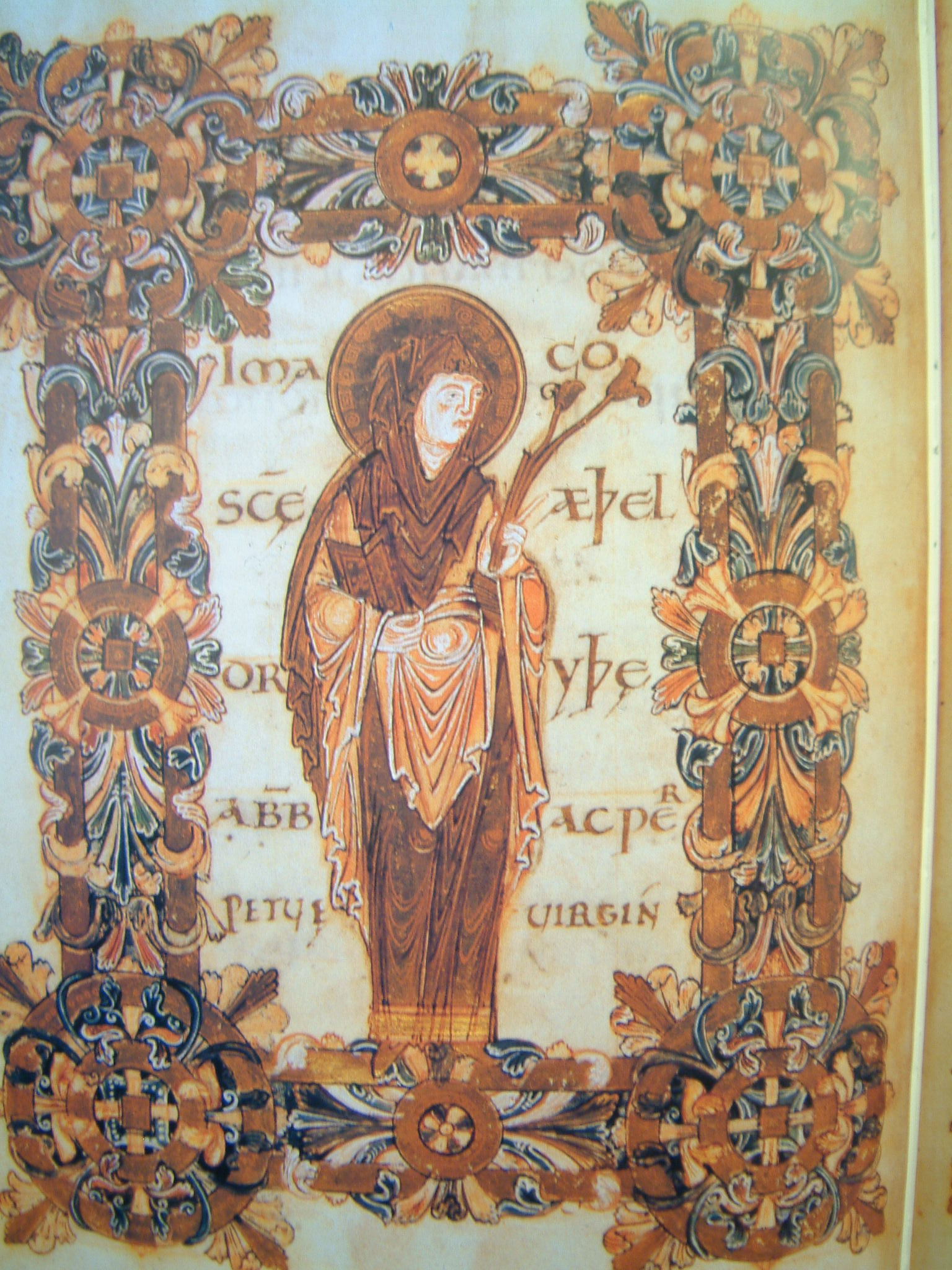
Saint Æthelthryth of Ely

The Latin text contains the blessings read by a bishop during mass. Each day in the liturgical year and each saint's feast day had a different blessing. The manuscript contains blessings for the feast of three Saints, St. Vedast, St. Ætheldreda, and St. Swithun which are local feasts and would not have been found in a benedictional from another area. The text seems to be a conflation of a "Gregorian" benedictional which was derived from the supplement by St. Benedict of Aniane to the so-called Hadrianum, a sacramentary from Rome that had been in papal use, and an 8th-century text of the Gallican Rite. The manuscript also contains several blessings which were composed at Winchester. The "hybrid" text found in the Æthelwold Benedictional is also found in the Ramsey Benedictional (Paris, Bibliothèque Nationale, MS lat. 987), which also may have been written by Godeman. It is not certain which of the manuscripts was the original, although A. J. Prescott has argued that the Ramsey Benedictional was written by Godeman, using instructions given to him by Æthelwold, to be sent elsewhere; and that Æthelwold was so pleased with the result that he had another copy made for himself. David Dumville has argued that the hybrid text actually predates both the Ramsey and Æthelwold benedictionals. The hybrid text, however, was to be very influential in England and France in the 10th and 11th centuries.

== Illustrations ==
The miniature on f. 102v for the Feast of the Assumption, shows the death and Coronation of the Virgin, possibly the first Western depiction of the latter.
