= Edward the Martyr =

King of the English from 975 to 978

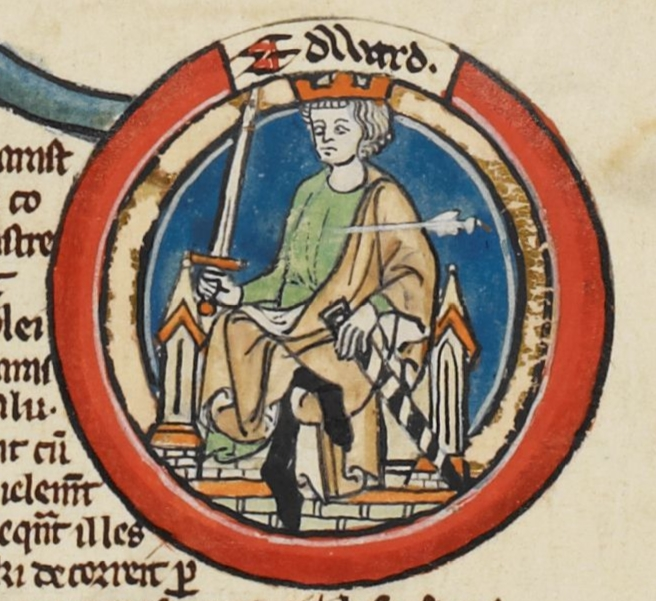
- Edward in an early fourteenth-century Genealogical Roll of the Kings of England

King of the English
- Reign: 8 July 975 – 18 March 978
- Predecessor: Edgar
- Successor: Æthelred II
- Born: c. 962
- Died: 18 March 978 (aged about 16); Corfe, Dorset
- Burial: Wareham, Dorset; later Shaftesbury, Dorset
- House: Wessex
- Father: Edgar
- Mother: Æthelflæd (probably)

Edward the Martyr (c. 962 – 18 March 978) was King of the English from 8 July 975 until he was killed in 978. He was the eldest son of King Edgar (r. 959–975). On Edgar's death, the succession to the throne was contested between Edward's supporters and those of his younger half-brother, the future King Æthelred the Unready. As they were both children, it is unlikely that they played an active role in the dispute, which was probably between rival family alliances. Edward's principal supporters were Dunstan, Archbishop of Canterbury, and Æthelwine, Ealdorman of East Anglia, while Æthelred was backed by his mother Queen Ælfthryth and her friend Æthelwold, Bishop of Winchester. The dispute was quickly settled. Edward was chosen as king and Æthelred received the lands traditionally allocated to the king's eldest son in compensation.

Edgar had been a strong and overbearing king and a supporter of the monastic reform movement. He had forced the lay nobility and secular clergy to surrender land and sell it at low prices to the monasteries. Æthelwold had been the most active and ruthless in seizing land for his monasteries with Edgar's assistance. The nobles took advantage of Edgar's death to get their lands back, mainly by legal actions but sometimes by force. The leading magnates were split into two factions, the supporters of Ælfhere, Ealdorman of Mercia, and Æthelwine, who both seized some monastic lands which they believed belonged to them, but also estates claimed by their rivals. The disputes never led to warfare.

Edward's short reign was brought to an end by his murder in March 978 in unclear circumstances. He was killed on his step-mother Ælfthryth's estate at the Gap of Corfe in Dorset, and hurriedly buried at Wareham. A year later, his body was translated with great ceremony to Shaftesbury Abbey in Dorset. Contemporary writers do not name the murderer, but almost all narratives in the period after the Norman Conquest name Ælfthryth. Some modern historians agree, but others do not. Another theory is that the killers were thegns of Æthelred, probably acting without orders.

Medieval kings were believed to be sacrosanct, and Edward's murder deeply troubled contemporaries who regarded it as a mortal sin. He soon came to be revered as a saint, and his feast of 18 March is listed in the festal calendar of the Book of Common Prayer of the Church of England. Edward was known in his own time for physical and verbal abuse of his associates and companions, and historians consider his veneration thoroughly undeserved.

== Sources ==
The historian Levi Roach comments: "Little is known about Edward's reign save what can be gleaned from a few short notices in the Chronicle and the three authentic charters in his name." Other pre-Conquest sources include Charter S 937 (Note: A charter's S number is its number in Peter Sawyer's catalogue of Anglo-Saxon charters, available online at the Electronic Sawyer.) of around 999, which gives details of his election as king, Byrhtferth of Ramsey's Life of St Oswald, written around 1000, and parts of some manuscripts of the Anglo-Saxon Chronicle (ASC). The Passio et Miracula Sancti Eadwardi Regis et Martyris (Passion and Miracles of Saint Edward, King and Martyr), was written around 1100, perhaps by the hagiographer Goscelin. (Note: Fell and Ridyard think that the Passio was probably written by Goscelin, but Paul Hayward considers this "highly unlikely", arguing that "the work has little of the sweeping flair and distinctive vocabulary which characterises Goscelin's oeuvre".) Post-Conquest chroniclers giving accounts of Edward's reign include William of Malmesbury and John of Worcester.

== Background ==
In the ninth century, Anglo-Saxon England came under increasing attack from Viking raids, culminating with an invasion by the Viking Great Heathen Army in 865. By 878, the Vikings had overrun the kingdoms of Northumbria, East Anglia, and Mercia, and nearly conquered Wessex, but in that year the West Saxons under King Alfred the Great (871–899) achieved a decisive victory at the Battle of Edington. Over the next fifty years, the West Saxons and Mercians gradually conquered the Viking-ruled areas, and in 927 Alfred's grandson Æthelstan (924–939) became the first king of all England when he conquered Northumbria. He was succeeded by his half-brother and Edward's grandfather, Edmund, who almost immediately lost control of the north to the Vikings, but recovered full control of England by 944. He was killed in a brawl with an outlaw in 946, and as his sons Eadwig and Edgar were infants, their uncle Eadred (946–955) became king. Like Edmund, Eadred inherited the kingship of the whole of England and soon lost it when York (southern Northumbria) accepted a Viking king, but he recovered it when the York magnates expelled King Erik Bloodaxe in 954.

Eadred's key advisers included Dunstan, Abbot of Glastonbury and future Archbishop of Canterbury. Eadred, who suffered from ill health, was in his early thirties when he died in 955, and Eadwig succeeded at the age of around fifteen. He was the first king since the early ninth century not to face the threat of imminent foreign invasion, and England remained free from Viking attacks until 980, after Edward's death. From the start, Eadwig demonstrated his determination to establish his independence from his uncle's advisers. He clashed with Dunstan and sent him into exile. In 957, the kingdom was divided between Eadwig, who kept Wessex, and Edward's father Edgar, who became king of Mercia and other lands north of the Thames. It is unclear whether this had been planned since the beginning of his reign or was the result of a successful revolt brought about by Eadwig's incompetence.

Eadwig died in 959, and Edgar succeeded to the rule of the whole kingdom. Eadwig had appointed Ælfhere to be ealdorman (Note: Ealdorman was the second rank of the lay aristocracy below the king. They governed large areas as the king's local representatives and led local levies in battle.) of Mercia, and he became the premier layman, a status he retained until his death in 983. His rise was at the expense of the family of Æthelstan Half-King, (Note: Æthelstan was known as the Half-King because kings were said to rely on his advice. He retired in 957 and was succeeded as ealdorman of East Anglia by his eldest son, Æthelwold, Ælfthryth's first husband, who died in 962. Æthelwold was succeeded as ealdorman by his youngest brother, Æthelwine.) Ealdorman of East Anglia, leading to a rivalry between the families which disrupted the country in Edward's reign. The Benedictine reform movement reached its peak in Edgar's reign under the leadership of Dunstan, Oswald, Archbishop of York, and Æthelwold, Bishop of Winchester. It became dominant as a result of the strong support of Edgar, earning him high praise by contemporary and later monastic chroniclers. He was a strong, indeed overbearing ruler, and he enriched Benedictine monasteries by forcing the aristocracy and secular (non-monastic) religious institutions to surrender land to them. Æthelwold was the most active and ruthless of the Benedictine leaders in securing land to support his monasteries, in some cases driving secular clergy out of their establishments in favour of monks. Edgar died at the age of only thirty-one or thirty-two in 975.

== Family ==
Edward, who was born in around 962, was the eldest of the four known children of King Edgar. No contemporary source gives the name of Edward's mother, and post-Conquest sources give varying accounts. The earliest is a life of Dunstan by Osbern of Canterbury, written around 1090. He wrote that Edward's mother was a nun at Wilton Abbey whom the King seduced, and Dunstan punished Edgar by imposing a seven-year penance which delayed his coronation. Osbern's account is rejected by later chroniclers and modern historians. When Eadmer wrote a life of Dunstan in the early twelfth century, he included an account of Edward's parentage which he obtained from his friend Nicholas of Worcester, who consulted ancient chronicles. Nicholas said that Edward was the son of Edgar's lawful wife Æthelflæd candida (the white), daughter of Ealdorman Ordmær. No ealdorman with that name is known, but some historians identify Æthelflæd's parents as a vir potens (powerful man) called Ordmær and his wife Ealde, who gave Hatfield in Hertfordshire to Æthelstan Half-King in exchange for land in Devon. John of Worcester, writing in the early twelfth century, also said that Edward was the son of Æthelflæd, adding that she had the byname eneda (duck). Edgar, who was brought up by Æthelstan Half-King's wife Ælfwynn, probably met Æthelflæd as a result of the connection between her father and his foster-father. (Note: The twelfth century Liber Eliensis states that Edgar later claimed that Ordmær and Ealde bequeathed the land at Hatfield to him and gave the Hatfield land to Ely Abbey. After his death Æthelstan's sons claimed that Edgar had forced him to surrender it. They brought a successful action to recover the land from the abbey.) Almost all modern historians who have discussed Edward's parentage say that his mother was Æthelflæd, (Note: Ann Williams disputes the consensus, suggesting that Edward was a son of Wulfthryth and thus a full brother of Edith. She thinks that Æthelflæd was invented to absolve Edgar from Osbern's charge that he seduced a nun.) and most think that she was Edgar's first wife. The historian Nicholas Brooks argues that Edgar must have married Æthelflæd because Dunstan backed Edward's succession to the throne, and he was a strong opponent of irregular unions who would not have supported the claim of an illegitimate son. However, the historian Cyril Hart describes Edward as "of doubtful legitimacy". Æthelflæd probably died shortly after his birth. Edward's tutor in religion was Sideman, Bishop of Crediton.

Edgar had his only known daughter, Edith, by his second known consort, Wulfthryth, who retired shortly afterwards to Wilton Abbey with her child. (Note: Historians do not agree on Wulfthryth's status. Rosalind Love refers to her as a concubine, whereas her status as wife is accepted by Pauline Stafford and defended by Barbara Yorke.) In 964, Edgar married Ælfthryth, the widow of Æthelstan Half-King's eldest son, Æthelwold. Her father was Ordgar, a leading Devonshire thegn who was appointed an ealdorman in the same year. She had two sons, Edmund, who died in 971, and the future King Æthelred the Unready, who was born around 968. She was the only wife of Edgar to be crowned, and she became a powerful political figure, especially in her son's reign.

== Disputed succession ==
Edward is first recorded as a witness to the Winchester New Minster Charter in 966. Ælfthryth attested as the "legitimate wife" of the King and Edmund as his "legitimate son", whereas Edward was described as "begotten by the same king". It is uncertain whether this was on the King's instruction, which would indicate that he wished to cut Edward out of the succession, or was ordered by Bishop Æthelwold, who was a friend and ally of Ælfthryth. The historian Barbara Yorke sees the denial of Edward's legitimacy as "opportunist special pleading" by Æthelwold. A genealogy created at Dunstan's Glastonbury Abbey around 969 gives Edward precedence over Edmund and Æthelred. When Edgar died on 8 July 975 there was a dispute over the succession, but as Edward was around thirteen and Æthelred six to nine, the historian Sean Miller observes that "they were surely figureheads rather than active participants".

Some historians have seen Edward's supporters as defenders of monastic reform and Æthelred's as its opponents, but there were supporters on both sides, and this view is now generally rejected. The real reasons for choosing between them probably lay in family alliances. Bishop Æthelwold backed his friend Ælfthryth, who naturally put forward the claim of her son Æthelred, while Archbishop Dunstan was Edward's chief supporter. According to John of Worcester, Archbishop Oswald also supported Edward. Oswald was at odds with Ealdorman Ælfhere, who probably supported Æthelred, (Note: In his will, Ælfhere's brother Ælfheah described Ælfthryth as his gefædera, a word which denotes the relationship between a parent and a godparent or godparents of the same child. He made bequests to Ælfthryth and her sons, "the elder ætheling" and "the younger ætheling". Edward is not mentioned.) together with his brother-in-law Ælfric Cild, while Ælfhere's enemy Æthelwine (son of Æthelstan Half-King) probably backed Edward.

Byrhtferth's life of Oswald portrays Edward as an unstable and violent young man:

Now certain of the magnates of this realm wished to elect the elder son of King Edgar, named Edward, as king; some of the ealdormen wanted the younger son, because he seemed more gentle to everyone in word and deed. But the elder son struck not only fear but even terror into everyone; he hounded them not only with tongue-lashings but even with cruel beatings – and most of all those who were members of his own household."

The historian Frank Stenton comments in his "magisterial and massively authoritative" Anglo-Saxon England: "Long after [Edward] had passed into veneration as a saint it was remembered that his outbursts of rage had alarmed all who knew him ... It may have been partly for this reason that a large number of nobles resolved to promote the election of Æthelred, the younger brother."

The Benedictine monk Eadmer of Canterbury wrote in his hagiographical life of Dunstan:

When this Edward ought to have been consecrated as king, many of the princes of the land sought to oppose that he should be made king, on the one hand, because they were wary of the severity of his character with which he had customarily criticized the excesses of his men fiercely and on the other because they knew that his mother, though legally married, had not, however, been consecrated to the kingdom – just as his father had not – when she gave birth to him.

The historian Ann Williams is sceptical of the last point, commenting that while it is possible that consecration of the king's wife before she gave birth may have been an issue in the tenth century, Eadmer was writing in the early twelfth century when it was an argument raised in favour of King Henry I against his elder brother, and this may have influenced his interpretation. In addition, as Eadmer says that Edgar was not crowned until two years before his death, the same argument applied to Æthelred.

The dispute was soon settled. A calendar entry in a manuscript dating to the late tenth or early eleventh century gives the date of Edward's election as king as 19 July, less than a fortnight after Edgar's death. A charter probably dating to 999 states that Edward was unanimously chosen as king by the leading men of both orders. Æthelred was given the lands traditionally held by the king's sons, including some which had been granted by Edgar to Abingdon Abbey, and which were now forcibly repossessed by the order of all the leading nobles. Æthelred commented in the charter that "whether they did this thing justly or unjustly, they themselves may know", and he granted other lands to Abingdon in compensation. The charter probably reflects a settlement under which Æthelred's supporters agreed to Edward's succession in return for the land grant. He was crowned by Archbishop Dunstan at Kingston upon Thames, possibly on the same day he was elected.

The post-Conquest Passio gives a different account, claiming that Dunstan forced through the coronation of Edward as king: "But when, at the time of [Edward's] consecration, some of the leading men of the nation had wished to oppose [it], St Dunstan persevered single-mindedly in his election, and, taking hold of the banner of the holy cross which was customarily carried before him, he fixed it upright in the middle, and with the remaining pious bishops consecrated him king."

== Edward's reign ==
=== The "anti-monastic reaction" ===
Edward's succession was followed by what historians sometimes call the "anti-monastic reaction". According to the Anglo-Saxon Chronicle, Ælfhere and many other nobles, described by ASC D (Note: Manuscripts of the Anglo-Saxon Chronicle are conventionally labelled ASC A to ASC F.) as the "adversaries of God", launched attacks on monasteries. His rival Æthelwine was called amicus Dei (friend of God), and portrayed as the chief defender of the monks, by Byrhtferth, who wrote that in Edward's reign:

the commonwealth of the entire realm was shaken; bishops were perplexed, ealdormen were angry, monks were struck with fear, the people were terrified, and the secular clerics were made happy, because their time had come. Abbots are now expelled, together with their monks; clerics are brought in together with their wives; and 'the last error was worse than the first' ... Monks who were formerly accustomed to sit on caparisoned horses and with their companions to sing the melodious song of King David, could then be seen carting a burden, not being carried like the ancient patriarch on a carriage into Egypt, or walking about with companions and friends, 'without a purse, without shoes'.

However, most historians are sceptical of the claim that the conflict was between the supporters and opponents of monasticism, and attribute the disturbances to the nobles' personal rivalries and their determination to recover or obtain compensation for lands which Edgar had forced them to give up to monasteries. Æthelwine founded Byrhtferth's Ramsey Abbey, but he was remembered at Ely Abbey for stealing several of their estates. Ælfhere is said to have disbanded monasteries founded by Æthelwold, but also to have protected Æthelwold's Ely from Æthelwine and been a benefactor of Dunstan's Glastonbury and Æthelwold's Abingdon. Williams comments that "there was more to the seizure of monastic lands than anti-monasticism. In many, perhaps most cases, it was the sharp practice involved in acquiring lands for the reformed houses that was being questioned, as the sellers (who had probably been put under considerable pressure) or their heirs sought to obtain a price closer to the actual market value."

Historians find it very difficult to judge the extent of disorder in Edward's reign in view of the very limited information available. At some point, Ælfhere and Æthelwine appear to have come close to open warfare, but there were no battles. A thegn called Leofsige seized estates at Peterborough, Oundle and Kettering, causing such disorder that no crops were sown for two years. Leofsige was killed by Æthelwine's brother, Ælfwold, who was then pardoned for the crime by Bishop Æthelwold. The historian George Molyneaux is sceptical of the portrayal of Edward's reign as a time of rampant strife in view of the lack of evidence of fighting.

=== Administration ===
Witans (king's councils) met at Kingston upon Thames, perhaps on the occasion of Edward's coronation, at Kirtlington in Oxfordshire after Easter 977, and at Calne in Wiltshire in the same year. The meeting at Calne was held on an upper storey which collapsed; many leading counsellors were injured and some killed, but Dunstan was unharmed because he was standing on a beam. Ælfhere attested first among the ealdormen and Æthelwine second in all of Edward's charters, indicating that they retained their positions from the previous reign as the leading lay magnates. Edward's first charter was attested by almost all the leading magnates, showing that his rule had been generally accepted. This is the first charter which lists the chronicler Æthelweard as an ealdorman and he was presumably appointed by Edward. There appear to have been no ealdormen covering the south of England in the early 970s, perhaps because Edgar's authority was so great that he was able to cover the area personally. After Edward acceded, three ealdormen were appointed to cover the area, Æthelweard in west Wessex, Æthelmær in Hampshire and Eadwine in Sussex and Kent. If stability had depended on Edgar's personal authority, then it is not surprising that the authorities found it so difficult to maintain order after his death. The Anglo-Saxon Chronicle disapprovingly records the exile of Ealdorman Oslac of York during Edward's reign, but the circumstances are unknown. Few other events are recorded during his reign: there was a severe famine in 976, Bishop Sideman died in 977, and in 978 Dunstan purchased land near Hendon in Middlesex from Edward.

=== Charters ===
The historian Simon Keynes sees a diplomatic tradition which extends from the charters late in Edgar's reign to early in Æthelred's, but excluding the intervening "slightly anomalous" charters of Edward. Five charters survive which purport to date to the three years and nine months of Edward's reign, a low number as the average in the period was four to five a year. The authenticity of Charters S 828 and S 829 is disputed. Keynes says that they are fraudulent, but have witness lists which are probably based on genuine texts. The editor of these charters, Susan Kelly, describes them as "very difficult documents", and thinks that they may be genuine. They both appear to have been drawn up at the same time by the same careless draftsman during or close to Edward's reign. S 828 is a grant of thirteen hides of land at Kingston Bagpuize in Berkshire by King Edward to Bishop Ælfstan, probably of Ramsbury. S 829 grants seven hides in the same village to Abingdon Abbey. The boundary clause is the same in both charters, perhaps because the bishop and abbey held different scattered units within the estate. Charter S 831 from the Old Minster, Winchester, is probably authentic and is based on one of 941. It is a grant by Edward to his minister Ælfric of land at Wylye in Wiltshire. Charter S 832 is a large grant of land in Cornwall by Edward to Ealdorman Æthelweard. It is closely related to Charter S 830, a grant of land at Cheriton Bishop in Devon by Edward to his "faithful vassal" (fideli vasallo) Ælfsige. Both charters are from the Exeter archive but probably written at Crediton, and Hart doubts whether they are genuine in their present form.

=== Coinage ===
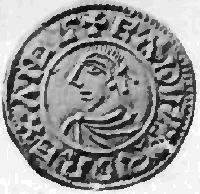
Obverse of a penny of Edward the Martyr produced at Stamford by the coiner Wulfgar

The only coin in common use in late Anglo-Saxon England was the silver penny. Until late in Edgar's reign, pennies produced by mints in different towns varied in design, weight and fineness (silver content). In the early 970s, he brought in his reform coinage, with a single design and much greater uniformity of weight and fineness. The coins, with a design called the Small Cross type, had a left-facing bust of the King on the obverse surrounded by a circle with the King's name (+EADGAR REX ANGLOR[UM]) around the edge. The reverse had a small cross in the centre with the moneyer's name and mint-place around the edge. Edgar's reform design was the sole coin type produced during Edward's reign, and it was replaced early in Æthelred's reign.

Edward's coins were on average slightly lighter than those of Edgar and heavier than those of Æthelred. The fineness was high and uniform following Edgar's reform at 96%, and this was maintained under Edward apart from a few slightly less fine coins produced in Lincoln and York. After Edward's death, fineness became more variable. During Edgar's reign, dies for coins were almost all cut at one centre, probably Winchester, and distributed from there to other mints across the kingdom. Under Edward, the centre supplied a far smaller number of mints and it was supplemented by regional die-cutting centres. This may have been due to the difficult political situation in his reign.

== Death ==
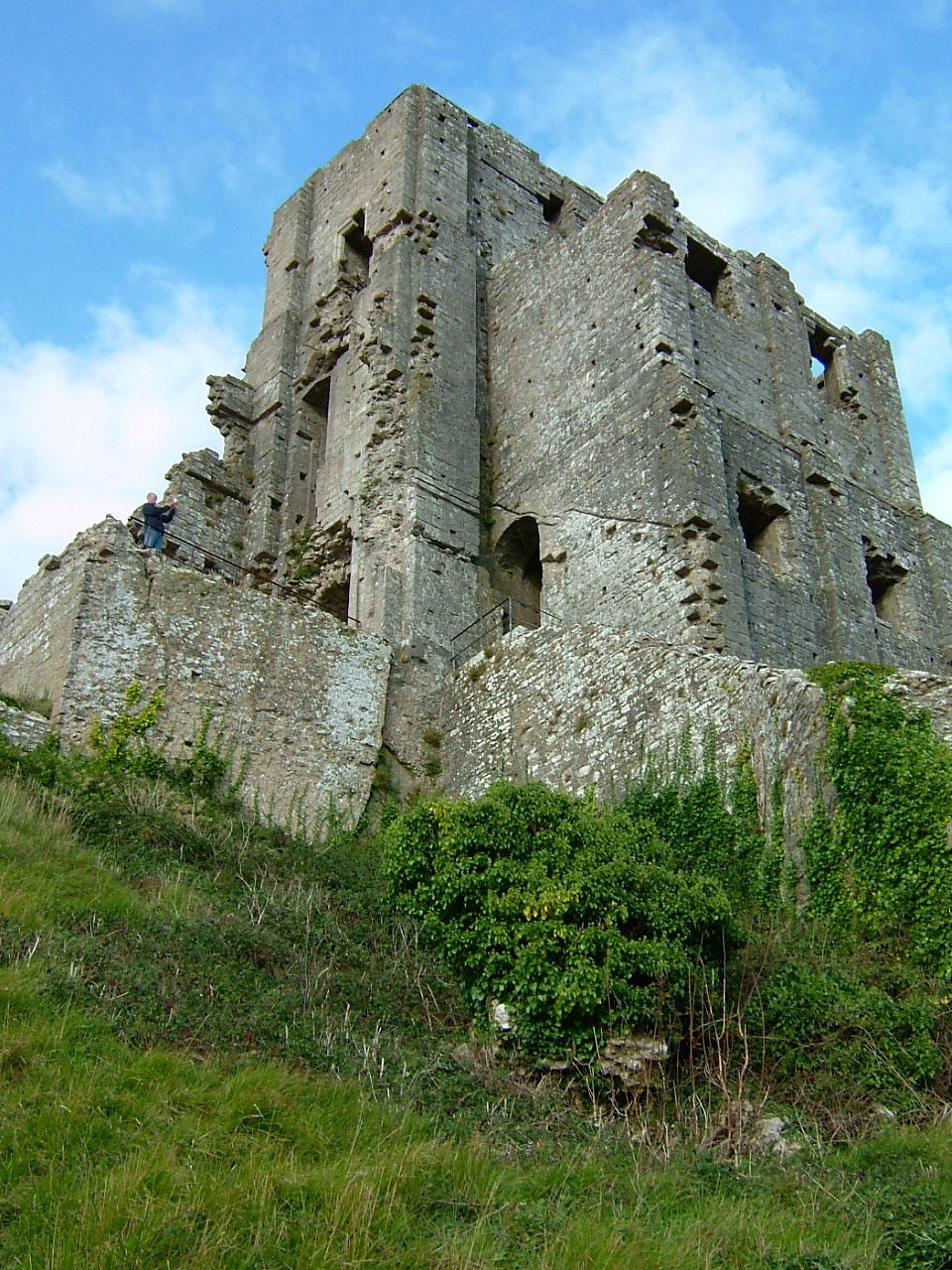
Corfe Castle after the Norman Conquest

Edward was killed on Ælfthryth's estate in the Gap of Corfe in the Purbeck Hills in Dorset on the evening of 18 March 978. (Note: The historian David Dumville argues that Edward was killed on 18 March 979, but most historians give 978, and Levi Roach thinks that there is little doubt that 978 is correct.) The only detailed pre-Conquest account is by Byrhtferth:

One day towards evening the remarkable and elected king, seeking the consolations of brotherly love, arrived at the house where his beloved brother was living with the dowager queen, as we have said. The magnates and leading men went to meet him, as was only fitting; he [the younger son] remained inside with the dowager queen, his mother. Those magnates had agreed among themselves a wicked plot: they were possessed of so damnable an intention and so murky and diabolical a blindness, that they did not fear to lay hands on God's anointed. Armed men surrounded him on all sides; with them was standing the royal butler, humbly waiting to be of service. The venerable king had with him very few soldiers, since he did not suspect anyone, trusting "in the Lord and in the might of His power". He had been instructed in holy scripture under the tutelage of Bishop Sideman; he was strong in body and sturdy. For when the conspirators surrounded him — and it was just as the Jews once surrounded our Lord — he remained sitting on his horse, fearless. They were seized by a single madness, an equal insanity ... The soldiers laid hold of him: one on his right-hand side drew him towards him, as if he wished to give him a kiss; another grabbed his left side firmly and gave him the death blow. And the King shouted out, as best he could: "What are you doing, breaking my right hand?" And suddenly he fell from his horse, and he was dead. This martyr of God was lifted up by his thegns, and taken to the house of a certain churl, where no Gregorian chant and no funereal lament was heard; rather, this distinguished king of the whole country lay covered only by a cheap blanket, awaiting the light of day. (Note: The medieval Latin scholar Michael Lapidge argues that parallels between the biblical description of the betrayal of Christ and Byrhtferth's account of Edward's death suggest that he may have fabricated it, but Yorke disagrees, and Roach sees little reason not to trust Byrhtferth.)

Byrhtferth does not say when and where Edward died, and the oldest surviving version of the Anglo-Saxon Chronicle (ASC A) just says that he was killed in 978. ASC C, written in the 1040s after Edward had come to be seen as a saint, states that he was martyred. The fullest account of his death in the Anglo-Saxon Chronicle is in the northern recension, ASC D and ASC E, (Note: ASC D and E are together known as the northern recension because they contain material of northern interest not found in other versions.) which post-dates the Conquest. This gives the date and location of his death. No version of the Anglo-Saxon Chronicle states who committed the murder, but the northern recension blames his relatives for failing to avenge his death, and a poem about Edward's death dating to around 1000 says: "It is certain that he died through envy, at the hands of his own kin."

Pre-Conquest accounts of the murder do not say who was responsible, whereas post-Conquest chroniclers and hagiographers almost all blame Ælfthryth. The Passio and John of Worcester claim that she ordered the killing, while William of Malmesbury has her handing him a drink to distract him and her servant stabbing him, and Henry of Huntingdon writes that she killed Edward herself. The Passio is so biased against Ælfthryth that it deletes favourable information about her in its sources, such as the Regularis Concordia of around 973, which laid down rules for monastic life. It gave Ælfthryth the role of protectress of nunneries, but the Passio changes the protectress to Edward's mother.

Modern historians have offered a variety of interpretations of Edward's killing. Some blame Ælfthryth's followers and think that she may have been personally responsible. Cnut's biographer, Michael Lawson, thinks that the failure to punish the killers is suspicious and points to Ælfthryth's guilt. Roach disagrees, seeing the fact that no contemporary blamed Ælfthryth as significant, and comments that we must be careful not to see conspiracies which did not exist. The editor of the Passio, Christine Fell, points out that many of the details of Ælfthryth's role appear in the earlier stories of the murders of Anglo-Saxon royals, Saint Kenelm by his sister and Saint Æthelberht by his potential mother-in-law. Fell argues that it was inevitable that Ælfthryth's hagiographical role in the Passio would similarly be that of scapegoat. Yorke comments that such stories "draw upon hagiographical conventions spiced with traditional beliefs in the enmity of step-mothers for step-children, and should not be taken as reliable accounts of what actually occurred".

Another theory is that the murder was the culmination of the conflict between Ælfhere and Æthelwine, and that Ælfhere had Edward killed to preserve his own power and put his own candidate on the throne. The historian Alan Thacker sees Ælfhere's role in the reburial of Edward as an act of expiation. However, Roach points out that Byrhtferth praises Ælfhere's role, even though he was hostile to the ealdorman, and would have condemned him if he had been implicated in the crime. The contemporary poem about Edward's death praises Ælfhere's role, describing him as "most worthy leader". Miller thinks that Æthelred's thegns probably acted on their own initiative in the hope of personal advancement.

Edward's personality may have been a factor in his death, as afterwards the opposing factions were able to reach a compromise. There were few changes at court: Ælfthryth and Bishop Æthelwold became more prominent, but Edward's officials mainly kept their positions. Williams challenges the consensus that Edward's death was the result of a plot. She compares his death to an earlier outbreak of violence due to a misunderstanding:

It is possible that King Edward's death was also 'accidental' in that, far from being planned, it arose from a provocative confrontation between the young king (prone to violent behaviour, according to Byrhtferth) and one or more of the noblemen attending on his brother. It remains curious that the perpetrator is not named; Edward's grandfather King Edmund was killed in similar circumstances but "it was widely known how he ended his life, that Leofa stabbed (ofstang) him at Pucklechurch". Could it be that too many people (perhaps not all of them belonging to Ælfthryth's faction) were secretly relieved to be rid of a violent and unstable youth?

== Legacy ==
=== Burial and translation ===
Edward's death deeply troubled contemporaries. Roach observes "Medieval kings were felt to be touched by divinity; not only had they been chosen by God, but like bishops they were anointed into their office with holy oil. Royal consecration was a well-established tradition and the reformers had done much to emphasize the God-given nature of royal authority further ... To kill a king was, therefore, more than a crime – it was a sin of the first order." England had a long tradition of revering murdered kings as saints, and the circumstances of Edward's death made it almost certain that he would come to be seen as a martyr, but this did not occur immediately. He was not regarded as saintly in his lifetime and he did not die defending Christianity. It was almost a year before he received royal burial, and the delay suggests that there was an argument over what to do with his body, with the case for honourable burial gradually gaining ground. ASC D and ASC E say that Edward was initially buried at Wareham without royal honour. Byrhtferth states that a year later "the renowned Ealdorman Ælfhere arrived with a great train"; he ordered Edward's body to be disinterred, and it was found to be incorrupt, which was taken as a miraculous sign; the body was carried with great ceremony for burial in Shaftesbury Abbey, a house of nuns. As the senior ealdorman, Ælfhere was probably charged with arranging the translation of Edward's body from Wareham to Shaftesbury for a proper burial to pave the way for Æthelred's coronation on 4 May. The early eleventh century Archbishop of York, Wulfstan, wrote that his body was burned, and Keynes comments that "the authority of Wulfstan is considerable", but as political circumstances required that Edward be decently buried, Ælfhere may have been charged with finding another body for the purpose.

Post-Conquest accounts, such as the Passio, have more complicated and hagiographical narratives. The Passio says that Ælfthryth had Edward's body concealed in a marsh, where it was miraculously revealed in February 979 by a column of fire, and locals took it to Wareham church for burial. Ælfhere was filled with joy when he heard about the discovery of the body, and he took it to Shaftesbury for reburial in a more worthy place. The Passio goes on to say that in 1001 Edward told "a certain religious" in a vision of his wish to be moved from the churchyard to a more secure place in the abbey. This information was conveyed to the abbess, who passed it to King Æthelred, and he joyfully gave instructions for the relics to be again translated. He ordered Wulfsige, the Bishop of Sherborne, and another prelate, perhaps Ælfsige, the abbot of the New Minster, Winchester, to carry out the ceremony. The translation took place on 20 June, but the King could not be present because he was preoccupied with a Danish invasion. However, the historian Paul Hayward points out that this second translation is not mentioned in contemporary sources and no pre-Conquest calendar prescribes a feast on 20 June; he argues that it was an invention.

=== Early cult ===
Edward was recognised as a saint soon after his death, and Æthelred appears to have been the chief sponsor of his brother's cult. It was promoted initially by the ecclesiastical and secular leadership to demonstrate the sanctity of the royal office, but as Viking raids intensified they came to be seen as punishment of the English people by God for a terrible crime, the killing of the Lord's anointed, for which they needed to make amends. Sigeric, Archbishop of Canterbury from 990 to 994, persuaded Æthelred to establish a monastery at Cholsey in honour of Edward, and the king appointed Germanus as abbot. Edward's cult was also recognised at Canterbury and promoted by Wulfstan. In 1001, Æthelred granted a former minster church and land at Bradford on Avon in Wiltshire to God and "his saint, my brother Edward, whom, drenched with his own blood, the Lord has seen fit to magnify in our time with many miracles", to provide a refuge for the nuns and Edward's relics against Viking attack. Sarah Foot describes the donation as "somewhat bizarre" as the Shaftesbury nunnery was in a fortified burh, whereas Bradford was unprotected. Byrhtferth says that the first miracles occurred at Edward's tomb eleven years after his death.

Wulfstan's Sermon of the Wolf to the English of around 1014 cites the murder of Edward and Æthelred being forced into exile by Sweyn's conquest of England in 1013 as examples of betrayals of lords by the English. Out of twenty-five calendars dating to before 1100, Edward's death date of 18 March is listed in eighteen; only nine saints were listed in more, and five also have a feast on 13 February commemorating his translation from Wareham to Shaftesbury. Æthelred's eldest son, Æthelstan left £6 "to Holy Cross and St Edward at Shaftesbury" in his will, made on his deathbed in 1014. Cnut also patronised Edward's cult, and the law code V Æthelred of 1008 includes a clause, possibly inserted by Cnut in around 1018, which commands that the feast of Edward's martyrdom be celebrated on 18 March throughout England. The historian David Rollason argues that Æthelred and Cnut promoted Edward's cult in order to heighten their prestige by emphasising the sanctity of their predecessor. The killing of Edward led to greater interest in other murdered royal saints by Oswald and in his monasteries, especially Ramsey and Winchcombe.

Æthelred's failure as a king has been seen by post-Conquest writers and some modern historians as a result of Edward's murder. Goscelin wrote in his life of Edith that Æthelred was unworthy to rule because "his succession had been purchased with his brother's blood". Stenton comments that Æthelred "began to reign in an atmosphere of suspicion which destroyed the prestige of the Crown. It was never fully restored in his lifetime ... Much that has brought the condemnation of historians on King Æthelred may well be due in the last resort to the circumstances under which he became king." His ineffective conduct as king suggests "the reaction of a weak king to the consciousness that he had come to power through what his subjects regarded as the worst crime committed among the English peoples since their first coming to Britain". Æthelred's support for his brother's cult has been seen as an attempt to dispel the cloud of suspicion which hung over him, but this view has been challenged since the late twentieth century by historians who have argued that contemporaries do not appear to have blamed Æthelred or his mother for the murder. Keynes argues that if the royal family had been blamed for Edward's death, glorification of him would have drawn attention to the crime and undermined Æthelred's position.

Several religious communities claimed to have acquired parts of Edward's body during Cnut's reign, but William of Malmesbury stated that half of Edward's body was taken to Leominster and half to Abingdon, where they both crumbled, and only the lung remained at Shaftesbury, where it was displayed, continuing to throb.

=== Later cult ===
Edward was the only tenth century king to be buried in a nunnery. Shaftesbury, which had been founded by Alfred the Great for one of his daughters, had strong royal connections, and the cult of Edward was valuable to it, giving it a high status among Wessex monasteries. At the end of the Anglo-Saxon period it was the richest Benedictine nunnery and Glastonbury the richest monastery of all. Later in the Middle Ages there was a saying that "If the abbot of Glastonbury might marry the abbess of Shaftesbury, their heir would have more land than the King of England". Edward's cult was important for the prosperity of the nunnery and town of Shaftesbury in the later Middle Ages, and in some medieval documents the town is called Edwardsstowe, "the holy place of Edward".

Lanfranc, the first Norman Archbishop of Canterbury, denied the sanctity of many Anglo-Saxon saints. Edward's cult survived but it was regarded as "rustic" and relegated to a minor status only to be honoured in establishments with a particular reason to honour him, such as Shaftesbury. His cult revived in the later Middle Ages, although almost wholly in the southern half of the country. He was regarded as one of the English national saints until they were relegated by the Plantagenets' preference for the more martial figure of Saint George. Edward survived the English Reformation, but as a low key figure only remembered on his feast day. Edward's feast of 18 March is still listed in the festal calendar of the 1662 Book of Common Prayer of the Church of England. The historian Frank Barlow comments that popular detestation of the crime led people to transform an unpleasant youth into a royal martyr. The historian Tom Watson commented, "For an obnoxious teenager who showed no evidence of sanctity or kingly attributes and who should have been barely a footnote, his cult has endured mightily well."

=== Dispute over Edward's bones ===
Shaftesbury Abbey was dissolved in 1539 and the buildings were almost wholly dismantled. Between 1930 and 1932, an amateur historian, John Wilson-Claridge, conducted excavations in the ruins of the abbey. No report of the excavations was ever published, but he claimed to have found the bones of Edward the Martyr in the north transept. The discovery was praised in The Times as one of the greatest historical discoveries of the century. In 1963, the bones were examined by the forensic pathologist Thomas Stowell, who concluded that they were of a young man between the ages of seventeen and nineteen who had suffered injuries consistent with the description of the murder in Byrhtferth's account. Stowell concluded that beyond reasonable doubt the bones were of Edward the Martyr. One of the bones was carbon-dated and found to date to the correct period. Historians' accounts of Stowell's findings usually mention that they were contradicted by the British Museum osteoarchaeologist Don Brothwell, who is believed to have examined the bones and concluded that they were of an older man and that the damage was probably post-mortem, although no report of his examination was ever published.

Wilson-Claridge negotiated with several churches to take the bones, but none was willing to agree to his requirement that they would be housed and revered as the true relics of the saint. In 1980, Wilson-Claridge met, in his own words, "by divine providence" a Mr Pobjoy, who was a member of the Russian Orthodox Church Abroad (ROCA), which agreed to accept the bones on Wilson-Claridge's terms. Wilson-Claridge's brother strongly objected to the bones going to ROCA, arguing that they should go back to Shaftesbury. The dispute was debated in letters to The Times, including one from Keynes which objected to the bones going to a Russian Orthodox church: "No Saxon can have deserved that fate". In 1988, a High Court hearing ruled that the bones could go to the ROCA Church of St Edward the Martyr, Brookwood, which had been established for the purpose. Historians are very sceptical that the bones in the Brookwood church are those of Edward the Martyr, both because the body taken to Shaftesbury in 979 was probably not Edward's, and because the bones found in 1931 were probably not the ones believed by contemporaries to be his.

=== Churches dedicated to Edward the Martyr ===
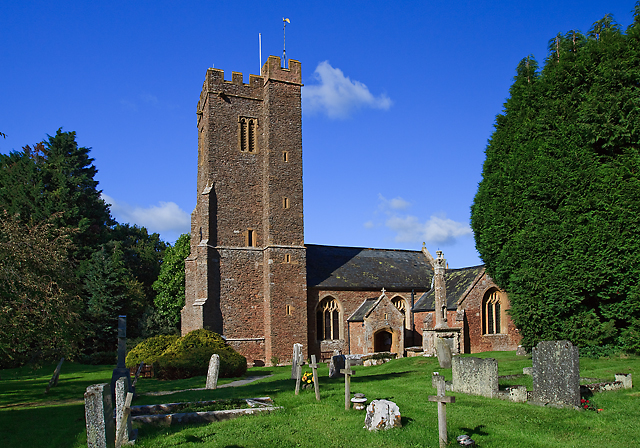
Church of St Edward King and Martyr, Goathurst, Somerset

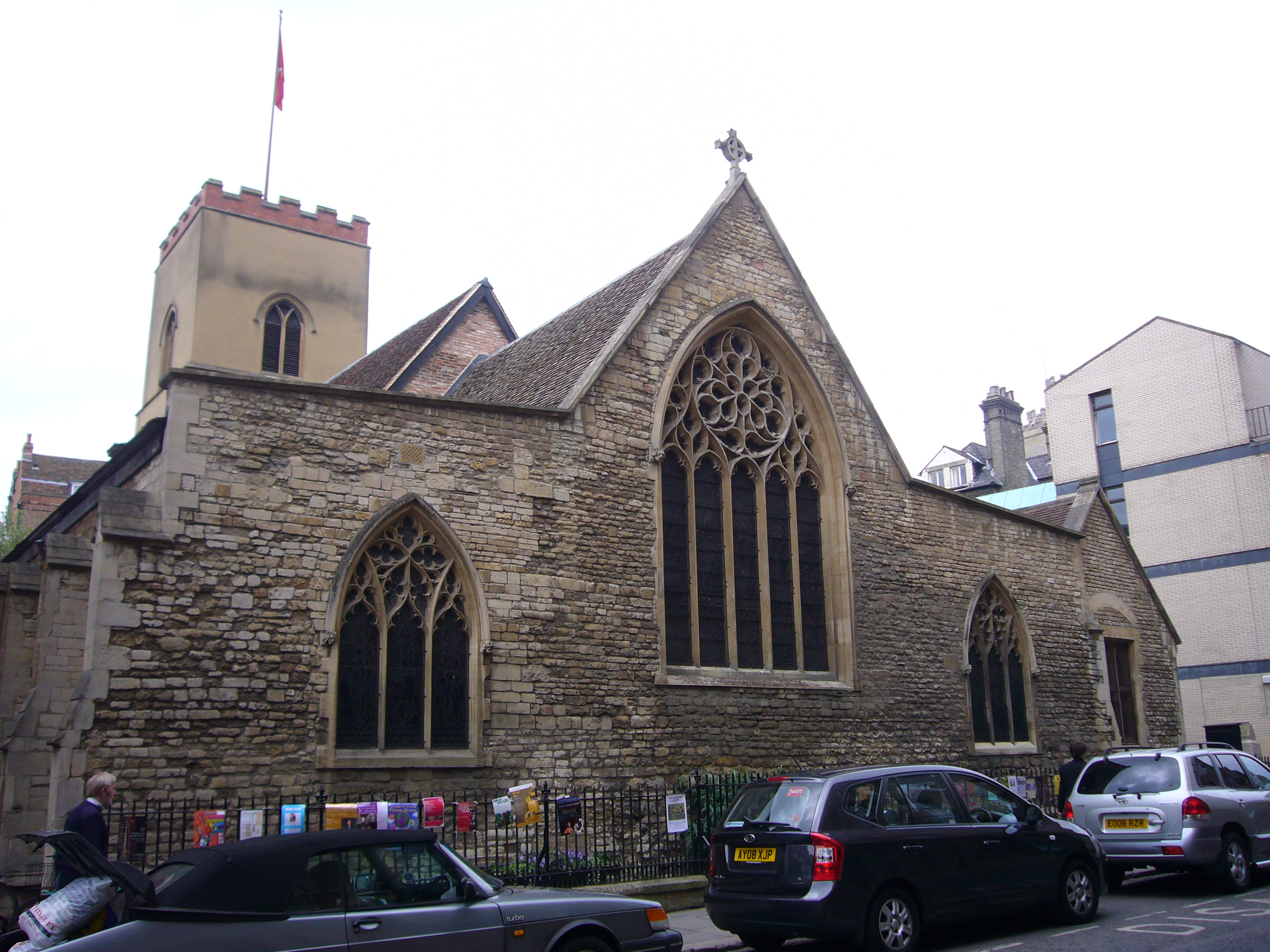
Church of St Edward King and Martyr, Cambridge

Churches dedicated to Edward the Martyr include the Church of St Edward King and Martyr in Peas Hill, Cambridge, the Church of St Edward King & Martyr, Castle Donington, the Church of St Edward, King and Martyr, Corfe Castle, the Church of St Edward King and Martyr, Goathurst, Somerset, the Orthodox Christian Church of Saint Edward the Martyr and Saint Paraskevi of Rome, Liverpool and the Church of St Edward the Martyr, New York.

== Sources ==
- Barlow, Frank (1997). Edward the Confessor (2nd ed.). New Haven, CT: Yale University Press. ISBN 978-0-300-07208-2.
- Brooks, Nicholas (1984). The Early History of the Church of Canterbury. Leicester, UK: Leicester University Press. ISBN 978-0-7185-1182-1.
- Bugyis, Katie (2019). The Care of Nuns: The Ministries of Benedictine Women in England during the Central Middle Ages. Oxford: Oxford University Press. ISBN 978-0-19-085128-6.
- Chaplais, Pierre (May 1966). "The Authenticity of the Royal Anglo-Saxon Diplomas of Exeter". Bulletin of the Institute of Historical Research. XXXIX (99): 1–34. ISSN 0020-2894.
- "Charity Commission, Saint Paraskevi of Rome".
- "Charter S 745". The Electronic Sawyer: Online Catalogue of Anglo-Saxon Charters. London: King's College London.
- "Charter S 828". The Electronic Sawyer: Online Catalogue of Anglo-Saxon Charters. London: King's College London.
- "Charter S 829". The Electronic Sawyer: Online Catalogue of Anglo-Saxon Charters. London: King's College London.
- "Charter S 830". The Electronic Sawyer: Online Catalogue of Anglo-Saxon Charters. London: King's College London.
- "Charter S 831". The Electronic Sawyer: Online Catalogue of Anglo-Saxon Charters. London: King's College London.
- "Charter S 832". The Electronic Sawyer: Online Catalogue of Anglo-Saxon Charters. London: King's College London.
- "Charter S 899". The Electronic Sawyer: Online Catalogue of Anglo-Saxon Charters. London: King's College London.
- "Charter S 937". The Electronic Sawyer: Online Catalogue of Anglo-Saxon Charters. London: King's College London.
- "Charter S 1450". The Electronic Sawyer: Online Catalogue of Anglo-Saxon Charters. London: King's College London.
- "Church of St Edward King & Martyr, Castle Donington". About us.
- "Church of St Edward, King and Martyr, Corfe Castle". About St Edwards.
- "Church of St. Edward the Martyr, New York". Early history.
- Cubitt, Catherine (2000). "Sites and Sanctity: Revisiting the Cults of Murdered and Martyred Anglo-Saxon Royal Saints". Early Medieval Europe. 9 (1): 53–83. doi:10.1111/1468-0254.00059. ISSN 0963-9462. S2CID 154743054.
- Cubitt, Catherine (2008). "Archbishop Dunstan: A Prophet in Politics". In Barrow, Julia; Wareham, Andrew (eds.). Myth, Rulership, Church and Charters. Abingdon, UK: Ashgate. pp. 145–166. ISBN 978-0-7546-5120-8.
- Darlington, R.R.; McGurk, Patrick, eds. (1995). The Chronicle of John of Worcester (in Latin and English). Vol. 2. Oxford: Clarendon Press. ISBN 978-0-19-822261-3.
- Dumville, David (2007). "The Death of King Edward the Martyr – 18 March 979?". Anglo-Saxon. 1: 269–283. ISSN 1754-372X.
- Fairweather, Janet, ed. (2005). Liber Eliensis: A History of the Isle of Ely from the Seventh Century to the Twelfth. Woodbridge, UK: The Boydell Press. ISBN 978-1-84383-015-3.
- Fell, Christine (1971). Edward, King and Martyr. Leeds, UK: University of Leeds School of English. ISBN 978-0-902296-07-7.
- Fell, Christine (1978). "Edward King and Martyr and the Anglo-Saxon Hagiographic Tradition". In Hill, David (ed.). Ethelred the Unready. Oxford: B.A.R. pp. 1–13. ISBN 978-0-86054-043-4.
- Fisher, D.J.V. (1952). "The Anti-Monastic Reaction in the Reign of Edward the Martyr". Cambridge Historical Journal. 10 (3): 254–270. doi:10.1017/s147469130000295x. ISSN 0018-246X.
- Foot, Sarah (2000). Veiled Women. Vol. II. Aldershot, UK: Ashgate. ISBN 978-0-7546-0044-2.
- Foot, Sarah (2011). "Æthelstan (Athelstan) (893/4–939), king of England". Oxford Dictionary of National Biography. Oxford University Press. doi:10.1093/ref:odnb/833. (subscription, Wikipedia Library access or UK public library membership required)
- Gem, Richard (24 September 1984). "Relics of a Saxon king". Letters to the editor. The Times. p. 11.
- Greenway, Diana, ed. (1996). Henry, Archdeacon of Huntingdon, Historia Anglorum The History of the English People. Oxford: Clarendon Press. ISBN 978-0-19-822224-8.
- Hart, Cyril (1975). The Early Charters of Northern England and the North Midlands. Leicester, UK: Leicester University Press. ISBN 978-0-7185-1131-9.
- Hart, Cyril (1992). The Danelaw. London: The Hambledon Press. ISBN 978-1-85285-044-9.
- Hart, Cyril (2005). "Æthelwine [Ethelwine, Æthelwine Dei Amicus] (d. 992)". Oxford Dictionary of National Biography. Oxford University Press. doi:10.1093/ref:odnb/8919. ISBN 978-0-19-861412-8. (subscription, Wikipedia Library access or UK public library membership required)
- Hart, Cyril (2007). "Edward [St Edward; called Edward the Martyr] (c. 962–978)". Oxford Dictionary of National Biography. Oxford University Press. doi:10.1093/ref:odnb/8515. ISBN 978-0-19-861412-8. (subscription, Wikipedia Library access or UK public library membership required)
- Hayward, Paul (1999). "Translation-Narratives in Post-Conquest Hagiography and English Resistance to the Norman Conquest". Anglo-Norman Studies: Proceedings of the Battle Conference 1998. xxi: 67–93. ISSN 0954-9927.
- Higham, Nicholas (1997). The Death of Anglo-Saxon England. Stroud, UK: Sutton Publishing. ISBN 978-0-7509-0885-6.
- Historic England. "Church of St Edward King and Martyr, Cambridge (1126076)". National Heritage List for England.
- Historic England. "Church of St Edward King and Martyr, Goathurst3 (1177353)". National Heritage List for England.
- Jayakumar, Shashi (2009). "Reform and Retribution: the Anti-Monastic Reaction in the Reign of Edward the Martyr". In Baxter, Stephen; Karkov, Catherine; Nelson, Janet; Pelteret, David (eds.). Early Medieval Studies in Memory of Patrick Wormald. London: Routledge. pp. 337–352. ISBN 978-1-138-24819-9.
- John, Eric (1996). Reassessing Anglo-Saxon England. Manchester, UK: Manchester University Press. ISBN 978-0-7190-5053-4.
- Keen, Laurence (1999). "Introduction". In Keen, Laurence (ed.). Studies in the Early History of Shaftesbury Abbey. Dorchester, UK: Dorset County Council. pp. 17–72. ISBN 978-0-85216-887-5.
- Kelly, Susan, ed. (1996). Charters of Shaftesbury Abbey. Anglo-Saxon Charters. Vol. 5. Oxford: Oxford University Press for the British Academy. ISBN 978-0-19-726151-4.
- Kelly, Susan, ed. (2001). Charters of Abingdon Abbey Part 2. Anglo-Saxon Charters. Vol. 8. Oxford: Oxford University Press for the British Academy. ISBN 978-0-19-726221-4.
- Keynes, Simon (1980). The Diplomas of King Æthelred the Unready 978-1016. Cambridge: Cambridge University Press. ISBN 978-0-521-02308-5.
- Keynes, Simon (27 September 1984). "Relics of a Saxon king". Letters to the editor. The Times. p. 11.
- Keynes, Simon (1999). "King Alfred the Great and Shaftesbury Abbey". In Keen, Laurence (ed.). Studies in the Early History of Shaftesbury Abbey. Dorchester, UK: Dorset County Council. pp. 1–16. ISBN 978-0-85216-887-5.
- Keynes, Simon; Lapidge, Michael, eds. (1983). Alfred the Great: Asser's Life of King Alfred & Other Contemporary Sources. London: Penguin Classics. ISBN 978-0-14-044409-4.
- Keynes, Simon (2002). An Atlas of Attestations in Anglo-Saxon Charters, c.670-1066. Cambridge: Dept. of Anglo-Saxon, Norse, and Celtic, University of Cambridge. ISBN 978-0-9532697-6-1.
- Keynes, Simon (2003). "Introduction". An Introduction to Anglo-Saxon England by Peter Hunter Blair with a New Introduction by Simon Keynes (3rd ed.). Cambridge: Cambridge University Press. pp. xi–xxxv. ISBN 978-0-521-83085-0.
- Keynes, Simon (2004). "Eadwig [Edwy] (c. 940–959)". Oxford Dictionary of National Biography. Oxford University Press. doi:10.1093/ref:odnb/8572. ISBN 978-0-19-861412-8. (subscription, Wikipedia Library access or UK public library membership required)
- Keynes, Simon (2005). "Wulfsige, Monk of Glastonbury, Abbot of Westminster (c. 990-3), and Bishop of Sherborne (c. 993-1002)". In Barker, Katherine; Hinton, David; Hunt, Alan (eds.). St Wulfsige and Sherborne. Oxford: Oxbow Books. pp. 53–94. ISBN 978-1-84217-175-2.
- Keynes, Simon (2008). "Edgar rex admirabilis". In Scragg, Donald (ed.). Edgar King of the English: New Interpretations. Woodbridge, UK: The Boydell Press. pp. 3–58. ISBN 978-1-84383-399-4.
- Keynes, Simon (2012a). "The Cult of King Edward the Martyr during the Reign of King Æthelred the Unready". In Nelson, Janet; Reynolds, Susan; Johns, Susan (eds.). Gender and Historiography: Studies in the Earlier Middle Ages in Honour of Pauline Stafford. London, UK: University of London School of Advanced Study Institute of Historical Research. pp. 115–125. ISBN 978-1-905165-79-7.
- Keynes, Simon (2012b). "The Burial of King Æthelred the Unready at St Paul's". In Roffe, David (ed.). The English and their Legacy, 900-1200: Essays in Honour of Ann Williams. Woodbridge, UK: The Boydell Press. pp. 129–148. ISBN 978-1-84383-794-7.
- Keynes, Simon (2013). "Church Councils, Royal Assemblies and Anglo-Saxon Royal Diplomas". In Owen-Crocker, Gale; Schneider, Brian (eds.). Kingship, Legislation and Power in Anglo-Saxon England. Woodbridge, UK: The Boydell Press. pp. 17–182. ISBN 978-1-84383-877-7.
- Lapidge, Michael (1996). "Byrhtferth and Oswald". In Brooks, Nicholas; Cubitt, Catherine (eds.). St Oswald of Worcester: Life and Influence. London: Leicester University Press. pp. 64–83. ISBN 978-0-7185-0003-0.
- Lapidge, Michael, ed. (2009). Byrhtferth of Ramsey: The Lives of St Oswald and St Ecgwine (in Latin and English). Oxford: Clarendon Press. ISBN 978-0-19-955078-4.
- Lapidge, Michael (2014). "Æthelwine". In Lapidge, Michael; Blair, John; Keynes, Simon; Scragg, Donald (eds.). The Wiley Blackwell Encyclopedia of Anglo-Saxon England (2nd ed.). Chichester, UK: Wiley Blackwell. p. 20. ISBN 978-0-470-65632-7.
- Lavelle, Ryan (2008). Aethelred II: King of the English (2nd ed.). Stroud, UK: The History Press. ISBN 978-0-7524-4678-3.
- Lawson, M. K. (2011). Cnut: England's Viking King 1016-35 (2nd ed.). Stroud, UK: The History Press. ISBN 978-0-7524-6069-7.
- Lewis, C. P. (2004). "Ordgar (d. 971)". Oxford Dictionary of National Biography. Oxford University Press. doi:10.1093/ref:odnb/20813. (subscription, Wikipedia Library access or UK public library membership required)
- Love, Rosalind (2014). "Eadgyth [Edith], St". In Lapidge, Michael; Blair, John; Keynes, Simon; Scragg, Donald (eds.). The Wiley Blackwell Encyclopedia of Anglo-Saxon England (2nd ed.). Chichester, UK: Wiley Blackwell. p. 154. ISBN 978-0-470-65632-7.
- Marafioti, Nicole (2014). The King's Body: Burial and Succession in Late Anglo-Saxon England. Toronto, Canada: University of Toronto Press. ISBN 978-1-4426-4758-9.
- Miller, Sean (2011). "Edward [called Edward the Elder] (870s?–924), king of the Anglo-Saxons". Oxford Dictionary of National Biography. Oxford University Press. doi:10.1093/ref:odnb/8514. (subscription, Wikipedia Library access or UK public library membership required)
- Miller, Sean (2014a). "Eadred". In Lapidge, Michael; Blair, John; Keynes, Simon; Scragg, Donald (eds.). The Wiley Blackwell Encyclopedia of Anglo-Saxon England (second ed.). Chichester, UK: Wiley Blackwell. pp. 154–155. ISBN 978-0-470-65632-7.
- Miller, Sean (2014b). "Edgar". In Lapidge, Michael; Blair, John; Keynes, Simon; Scragg, Donald (eds.). The Wiley Blackwell Encyclopedia of Anglo-Saxon England (second ed.). Chichester, UK: Wiley Blackwell. pp. 163–164. ISBN 978-0-470-65632-7.
- Miller, Sean (2014c). "Edward the Martyr". In Lapidge, Michael; Blair, John; Keynes, Simon; Scragg, Donald (eds.). The Wiley Blackwell Encyclopedia of Anglo-Saxon England (second ed.). Chichester, UK: Wiley Blackwell. pp. 167–168. ISBN 978-0-470-65632-7.
- Miller, Sean (2014d). "Æthelstan Half-King". In Lapidge, Michael; Blair, John; Keynes, Simon; Scragg, Donald (eds.). The Wiley Blackwell Encyclopedia of Anglo-Saxon England (second ed.). Chichester, UK: Wiley Blackwell. p. 19. ISBN 978-0-470-65632-7.
- Molyneaux, George (2015). The Formation of the English Kingdom in the Tenth Century. Oxford: Oxford University Press. ISBN 978-0-19-871791-1.
- Mynors, R.A.B.; Thomson, R.M.; Winterbottom, M., eds. (1998). William of Malmesbury: Gesta Regum Anglorum, The History of the English Kings (in Latin and English). Vol. I. Oxford: Clarendon Press. ISBN 978-0-19-820678-1.
- Naismith, Rory (2017). Britain and Ireland c. 400-1066. Medieval European Coinage: with a Catalogue of the Coins in the Fitzwilliam Museum, Cambridge. Vol. 8. Cambridge: Cambridge University Press. ISBN 978-0-521-26016-9.
- Naismith, Rory (2021). Early Medieval Britain, c. 500-1000. Cambridge: Cambridge University Press. ISBN 978-1-108-44025-7.
- Parlby, Geri (March 2003). "A King Turns Icon". BBC History Magazine. 4 (3): 200338. ISSN 1469-8552.
- Rahtz, Philip (March 1989). "The President's Piece". British Archaeological News. 4 (2): 17–18. ISSN 0269-1906.
- Ridyard, Susan (1988). The Royal Saints of Anglo-Saxon England. Cambridge: Cambridge University Press. ISBN 978-0-521-30772-7.
- Roach, Levi (2013). Kingship and Consent in Anglo-Saxon England, 871–978. Cambridge: Cambridge University Press. ISBN 978-1-107-03653-6.
- Roach, Levi (2016). Æthelred the Unready. New Haven, CT: Yale University Press. ISBN 978-0-300-22972-1.
- Rollason, David (1989). Saints and Relics in Anglo-Saxon England. Oxford: Basil Blackwell Ltd. ISBN 978-0-631-16506-4.
- Rumble, Alexander (2002). Property and Piety in Early Medieval Winchester: Documents Relating to the Topography of the Anglo-Saxon and Norman City and its Minster. Oxford: Clarendon Press. ISBN 978-0-19-813413-8.
- Ryan, Martin J. (2013). "The Age of Æthelred". In Higham, Nicholas J.; Ryan, Martin J. (eds.). The Anglo-Saxon World. New Haven, CT: Yale University Press. pp. 335–373. ISBN 978-0-300-12534-4.
- Stafford, Pauline (1989). Unification and Conquest. A Political and Social History of England in the Tenth and Eleventh Centuries. London: Edward Arnold. ISBN 978-0-7131-6532-6.
- Stafford, Pauline (2004). "Ælfthryth (d. 999x1001)". Oxford Dictionary of National Biography. Oxford University Press. doi:10.1093/ref:odnb/194. ISBN 978-0-19-861412-8. (subscription, Wikipedia Library access or UK public library membership required)
- Stafford, Pauline (2014). "Ealdorman". In Lapidge, Michael; Blair, John; Keynes, Simon; Scragg, Donald (eds.). The Wiley Blackwell Encyclopedia of Anglo-Saxon England (2nd ed.). Chichester, UK: Wiley Blackwell. pp. 156–157. ISBN 978-0-470-65632-7.
- Stenton, Frank (1971). Anglo-Saxon England (3rd ed.). Oxford: Oxford University Press. ISBN 978-0-19-280139-5.
- Stowell, Thomas (1971) [originally published in The Criminologist (1970), 5, pp. 97–119]. "The Bones of Edward the Martyr". In Morland, Nigel (ed.). Papers from The Criminologist. London: Wolfe Publishing Limited. pp. 141–160. ISBN 978-0-7234-0432-3.
- Thacker, Alan (1996). "Saint-Making and Relic Collecting by Oswald and his Communities". In Brooks, Nicholas; Cubitt, Catherine (eds.). St Oswald of Worcester: Life and Influence. London: Leicester University Press. pp. 244–268. ISBN 978-0-7185-0003-0.
- Turner, Andrew; Muir, Bernard, eds. (2006). Eadmer of Canterbury: Lives and Miracles of Saints Oda, Dunstan and Oswald (in Latin and English). Oxford: Oxford University Press. ISBN 978-0-19-925380-7.
- Watson, Tom (2021). "The Enduring Cult of Edward the Martyr". Southern History. 43: 1–19. ISSN 0142-4688.
- Whitelock, Dorothy, ed. (1930). Anglo-Saxon Wills. Cambridge: Cambridge University Press. OCLC 786120891.
- Whitelock, Dorothy, ed. (1979). English Historical Documents, Volume 1, c. 500–1042 (2nd ed.). London: Routledge. ISBN 978-0-415-14366-0.
- Williams, Ann (2003). Æthelred the Unready: The Ill-Counselled King. London: Hambledon and London. ISBN 978-1-85285-382-2.
- Williams, Ann (2004a). "Edmund I (920/21–946)". Oxford Dictionary of National Biography. Oxford University Press. doi:10.1093/ref:odnb/8501. ISBN 978-0-19-861412-8. (subscription, Wikipedia Library access or UK public library membership required)
- Williams, Ann (2004b). "Eadred [Edred] (d. 955)". Oxford Dictionary of National Biography. Oxford University Press. doi:10.1093/ref:odnb/8510. ISBN 978-0-19-861412-8. (subscription, Wikipedia Library access or UK public library membership required)
- Williams, Ann (2004c). "Ælfhere (d. 983)". Oxford Dictionary of National Biography. Oxford University Press. doi:10.1093/ref:odnb/182. (subscription, Wikipedia Library access or UK public library membership required)
- Williams, Ann (2014). "Edgar (called Edgar Pacificus) (943/4–975)". Oxford Dictionary of National Biography. Oxford University Press. doi:10.1093/ref:odnb/8463. (subscription, Wikipedia Library access or UK public library membership required)
- Winterbottom, Michael, ed. (2007). William of Malmesbury: Gesta Pontificum Anglorum, The History of the English Bishops (in Latin and English). Vol. 1. Oxford: Clarendon Press. ISBN 978-0-19-820770-2.
- Wormald, Patrick (1978). "Æthelred the Lawmaker". In Hill, David (ed.). Ethelred the Unready. Oxford: B.A.R. pp. 45–80. ISBN 978-0-86054-043-4.
- Yorke, Barbara (1988). "Æthelwold and the Politics of the Tenth Century". In Yorke, Barbara (ed.). Bishop Æthelwold: His Career and Influence. Woodbridge, UK: The Boydell Press. pp. 65–88. ISBN 978-0-85115-705-4.
- Yorke, Barbara (1999). "Edward, King and Martyr: A Saxon Murder Mystery". In Keen, Laurence (ed.). Studies in the early history of Shaftesbury Abbey. Dorchester, UK: Dorset County Council. pp. 99–116. ISBN 978-0-85216-887-5.
- Yorke, Barbara (2003). "The Legitimacy of St Edith". Haskins Society Journal. 11: 97–113. ISSN 0963-4959.
- Yorke, Barbara (2008). "The Women in Edgar's Life". In Scragg, Donald (ed.). Edgar, King of the English 959–975. Woodbridge, UK: The Boydell Press. pp. 143–157. ISBN 978-1-84383-928-6.
- Yorke, Barbara (2004a). "Æthelwold [St Æthelwold, Ethelwold] (904x9–984)". Oxford Dictionary of National Biography. Oxford University Press. doi:10.1093/ref:odnb/8920. (subscription, Wikipedia Library access or UK public library membership required)
- Yorke, Barbara (2004b). "Edith [St Edith, Eadgyth] (961x4–984x7)". Oxford Dictionary of National Biography. Oxford University Press. doi:10.1093/ref:odnb/8482. ISBN 978-0-19-861412-8. (subscription, Wikipedia Library access or UK public library membership required)
- Yorke, Barbara (2021). "Royal Burial in Winchester: Context and Significance". In Lavelle, Ryan; Roffey, Simon; Weikert, Katherine (eds.). Early Medieval Winchester: CommuAnities, Authority and Power in an Urban Space, c.800-c.1200. Oxford: Oxbow Books. ISBN 978-1-78925-623-9.

Edward the Martyr House of Wessex Born: c. 962 Died: 18 March 978
Regnal titles
Preceded by Edgar	King of England; 975–978	Succeeded by Æthelred the Unready
