= Guy Browning =

British comedian

Guy Browning (born 1964 in Chipping Norton) is an English humourist, after-dinner speaker and film director. He wrote the How To... column in The Guardian from 1999 to 2009. Before that he wrote about office politics and social climbing.

== Early life ==
Browning was educated at Magdalen College School and Lady Margaret Hall, Oxford. He started out in the comedy duo Dross Bros with Patrick Marber. The two fell out and Browning went into advertising with Darcy Macius Benton Bowles where he was responsible for the line "Delicious Meaty Chunks in a Nutritious Gravy". He went on to become the Creative Director of the Added Value Company before setting up his own business, Smokehouse, in 1997 which organises interactive events all over the world.

== Radio ==
Browning is a regular on BBC Radio 4, e.g. Small Talk (2003) and Weak at the Top, which ran for two series in 2005/6 starring Alexander Armstrong. The fictional John Weak works for Smokehouse, the name of Guy Browning's real business.

== Writing ==
Browning combines a serious career as a business writer with books such as Innervation: Rewire Yourself for the New Economy (2003) and Grass Roots Management (2002), with humorous columns, such as "Weak at the Top" in Management Today.

His books collecting his Guardian columns, Never Hit a Jellyfish with a Spade and Never Push When it Says Pull, were bestsellers. His work has been translated into eight languages. He published How to be Normal in 2014 and The British Constitution: First Draft in 2015.

In June 2009, Browning began directing his first film, Tortoise in Love, set in and around Kingston Bagpuize.

On 24 May 2012, the village of Kingston Bagpuize decamped en masse to view the premiere of Tortoise in Love, as part of the opening of the newly refurbished Leicester Square in London. The film had a UK release in July 2012 and went on to be released in the US, Canada, Australia and New Zealand.

He wrote the Sidestroke cartoon in the Sunday Times with Janet Brown.

== Personal life ==
Browning lives in Kingston Bagpuize in Oxfordshire with his three children.
