= Tortoise in Love =

- Theatrical release poster
- Directed by: Guy Browning
- Written by: Guy Browning
- Produced by: Steffan Aquarone
- Starring: Tom Mitchelson; Alice Zawadzki; Tom Yates; Mike Kemp; Steven Elder; Anna Scott; Lesley Staples; Duncan Armitage
- Music by: Geoff Cottrell
- Distributed by: Immense Productions
- Release dates: 14 May 2011 (Cannes Film Festival); 13 July 2012 (United Kingdom)
- Running time: 84 minutes
- Country: United Kingdom
- Language: English
- Budget: £500,000 cash & services rendered

Tortoise in Love is a 2012 British romantic comedy film. The story follows a microbiologist turned stately home gardener who enlists the help of his village in an attempt to woo a Polish au pair he has fallen in love with. First shown at the 2011 Cannes Film Festival, the film received its world premiere at Odeon West End, Leicester Square, the first film to premiere at Leicester Square since its official re-opening. The film made headlines as a result of having its funding entirely crowd sourced from the village of Kingston Bagpuize and the neighbouring village of Southmoor.

== Premise ==
Tom, a gardener at Kingston Bagpuize House, falls in love with Anya, a Polish au pair. He is agonisingly slow at making a move to win the heart of Anya, so the whole village comes together to help speed things up.

== Production ==
After failing to secure backing for a previous project, Browning came upon the idea of seeking funding for Tortoise in Love from his local village. He presented his idea to produce a feature film with a full theatrical release during a village meeting in summer 2009. In the end, 800 residents from the village invested between £10 and £1,000 each, along with a £10,000 grant from Defra's Rural Development Programme for England towards the total budget of £250,000 in cash. In addition, the residents provided another £250,000 in services rendered. In return, they received shares in the film, with any profits going towards village improvement projects.

Filmed and set in the village of Kingston Bagpuize, the filming took place over a six-week period with Kingston Bagpuize House and the local pub serving as backlot. While the main cast and key members of the production crew are professionals, the rest of the cast and crew were all provided for by the village residents and businesses. The local Women's Institutes provided the catering, hair salon provided the hair and make up, and a local composer Geoff Cottrell the film score, which won Best Original Score at the Idyllwild Film Festival in 2013. All of the non-local based personnel were housed in local homes.

== Reception ==
Review aggregator Rotten Tomatoes gives the film a 45% approval rating based on 11 reviews, with an average rating of 4.75/10.
