= Kingston Bagpuize =

Village in Oxfordshire, England

Coordinates: 51.682°N 1.413°W

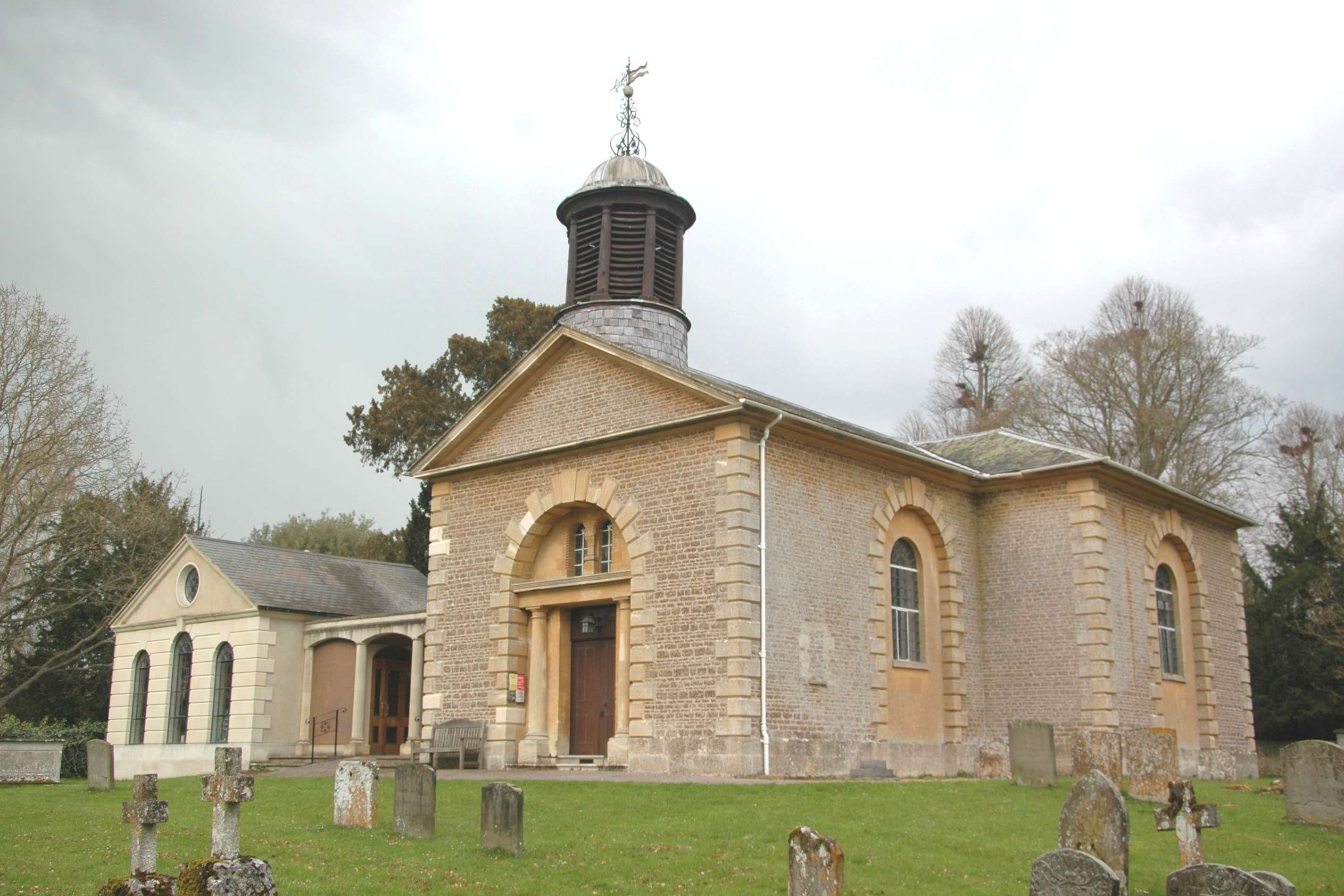
- St. John the Baptist parish church

- Location within Oxfordshire
- Population: 2,349 (parish, with Southmoor) (2011 Census)
- OS grid reference: SU4098
- Civil parish: Kingston Bagpuize with Southmoor
- District: Vale of White Horse
- Shire county: Oxfordshire
- Region: South East
- Country: England
- Sovereign state: United Kingdom
- Post town: Abingdon
- Postcode district: OX13
- Dialling code: 01865
- Police: Thames Valley
- Fire: Oxfordshire
- Ambulance: South Central
- UK Parliament: Witney
- Website: Kingston Bagpuize with Southmoor

Kingston Bagpuize (/ˈbæɡpjuːz/) is a village in the civil parish of Kingston Bagpuize with Southmoor, in the Vale of White Horse, Oxfordshire, England. It is about 6 miles (10 km) west of Abingdon. It was part of Berkshire, until the 1974 boundary changes transferred it to Oxfordshire. The 2011 Census recorded the population of Kingston Bagpuize with Southmoor as 2,349.

== Geography ==
The village is next to the junction of the A420 (Oxford–Swindon) and A415 (Abingdon–Witney) main roads. It is contiguous with Southmoor village to the west and about 1 mile (1.6 km) southeast of Longworth village.

== History ==
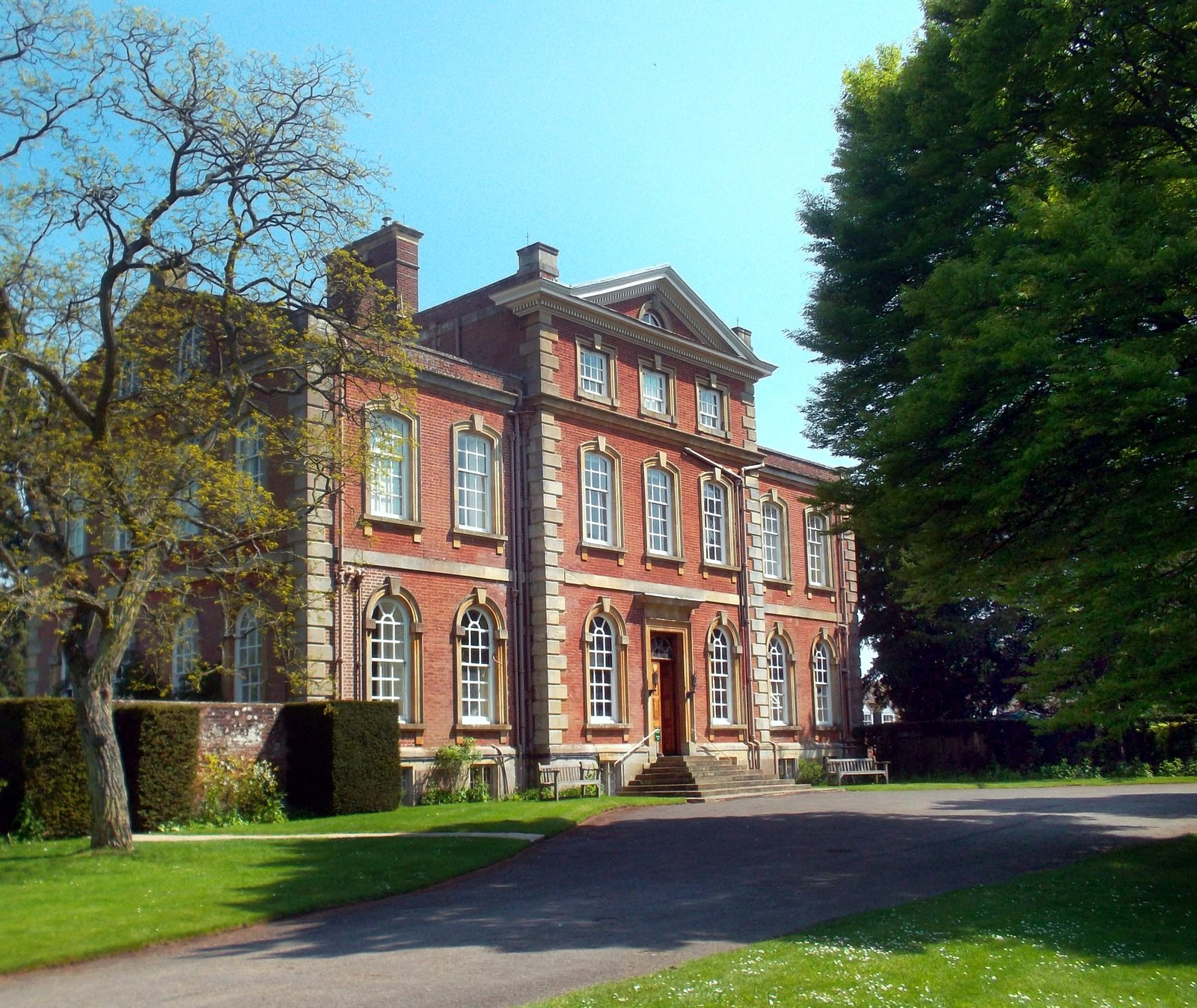
Kingston Bagpuize House

Two charters dating to the reign of King Edward the Martyr (975-978) grant land at Kingston Bagpuize, then called Cingestune, to Abingdon Abbey and Bishop Ælfstan, probably of Ramsbury. The authenticity of the charters is disputed. The toponym Kingston Bagpuize is derived from the village's original name Kingston plus the surname of Ralph de Bachepuz, a Norman nobleman from Bacquepuis in Normandy who aided William of Normandy in the Norman Conquest of England in 1066. The Church of England parish church of Saint John the Baptist was designed by John Fidel of Faringdon and built in 1799–1800. The building was remodelled in 1882 to the designs of Edwin Dolby. Kingston Bagpuize House was built around 1660, but extensively re-modelled in about 1720. In the 20th century it was the home of John Buchan, 2nd Baron Tweedsmuir, the son of the novelist John Buchan, 1st Baron Tweedsmuir.

In the Second World War there was a satellite airfield of RAF Abingdon east of the village called RAF Kingston Bagpuize. Remnants of the control tower are still visible near the cricket club. The lower part of the avenue of trees leading down from Kingston Bagpuize House were cut down during this time for aircraft safety. Evidence of this is that the trees at the east end of the avenue are shorter. The ancient parish of Kingston Bagpuize was a strip parish, extending from the River Thames in the north in a thin strip to the River Ock in the south. It became a civil parish in 1866. On 1 April 1971 it was merged with the civil parish of Draycott Moor to form the parish of Kingston Bagpuize with Southmoor. In 1961 the parish had a population of 166.

== Amenities ==
Kingston Bagpuize Cricket Club plays in The Oxford Times Cherwell Cricket League. Kingston Bagpuize and Southmoor have a bowls club and a Women's Institute. Kingston Bagpuize has an amateur theatre group. A village fête is also held annually, at the Kingston Bagpuize House, with residents participating by creating stalls to sell things such as food and drinks.

== Film and television ==
In 2012 the feature film Tortoise in Love was filmed in the village. The film was funded entirely with crowd funding from Kingston Bagpuize and the neighbouring village of Southmoor. Kingston Bagpuize House was used as the set of Cavenham Park, the residence of Lord Merton, in the television series Downton Abbey. It was also used as 'Mrs Goddard's School' in the 2020 feature film Emma.

== Literature ==
The fantasy author J.R.R. Tolkien used "Kingston Bagpuize" as a pseudonym for some of his early (pre-1937) poetry.

== Sources ==
- Pevsner, Nikolaus (1966). Berkshire. The Buildings of England. Harmondsworth: Penguin Books. p. 160.
