= Weak at the Top =

BBC Radio 4 situation comedy

- Genre: Sitcom
- Running time: 30 minutes
- Country of origin: United Kingdom
- Language(s): English
- Home station: BBC Radio 4
- Syndicates: BBC Radio 4 Extra
- Starring: Alexander Armstrong; Clare Perkins; Geoffrey Whitehead; Ron Cook
- Created by: Guy Browning
- Written by: Guy Browning
- Original release: 7 September 2005 – 19 July 2006
- No. of series: 2
- No. of episodes: 8
- Website: www.bbc.co.uk/programmes/b006wfyx

Weak at the Top is a situation comedy originally broadcast on BBC Radio 4 in 2005 and 2006. It revolves around a businessman anti-hero, John Weak (Alexander Armstrong), whose main attributes are summed up in the words "randy, sexist, and drunk". Weak is the Marketing Director of Smokehouse plc, a global corporation which turns "food you wouldn't give to your dog" into snacks and other packaged and processed items. Smokehouse's actual products are irrelevant to John Weak, whose objects in life are to have the best car, bed the hottest women, and be top dog.

John Weak's main problem is satisfying Smokehouse CEO Sir Marcus Rigsby (Geoffrey Whitehead), who is liable to demand adoption of the latest management fad "by Friday, John!". Thick-skinned personal assistant Hayley (Clare Perkins) fences with her boss John constantly. When the squeeze is really on, John turns to his "Director of Long Lunches and Work Avoidance", Bill Peters (Ron Cook), who can be counted on to rescue the situation with a brilliant scheme, usually after he is well into the second bottle of claret.

The script is written by Guy Browning who also writes books about management and business. He based the programme on his book of the same name. "Smokehouse" is the name of Browning's own marketing company.

== List of episodes ==
=== Series 1 ===
1. Gold Card
2. Smoked Meat
3. Knowing Your Unions
4. Trout Farm

=== Series 2 ===
1. Conference
2. Booty
3. Values
4. Otters
