= Kingston Bagpuize with Southmoor =

Coordinates: 51.68110°N 1.41708°W

- Civil parish
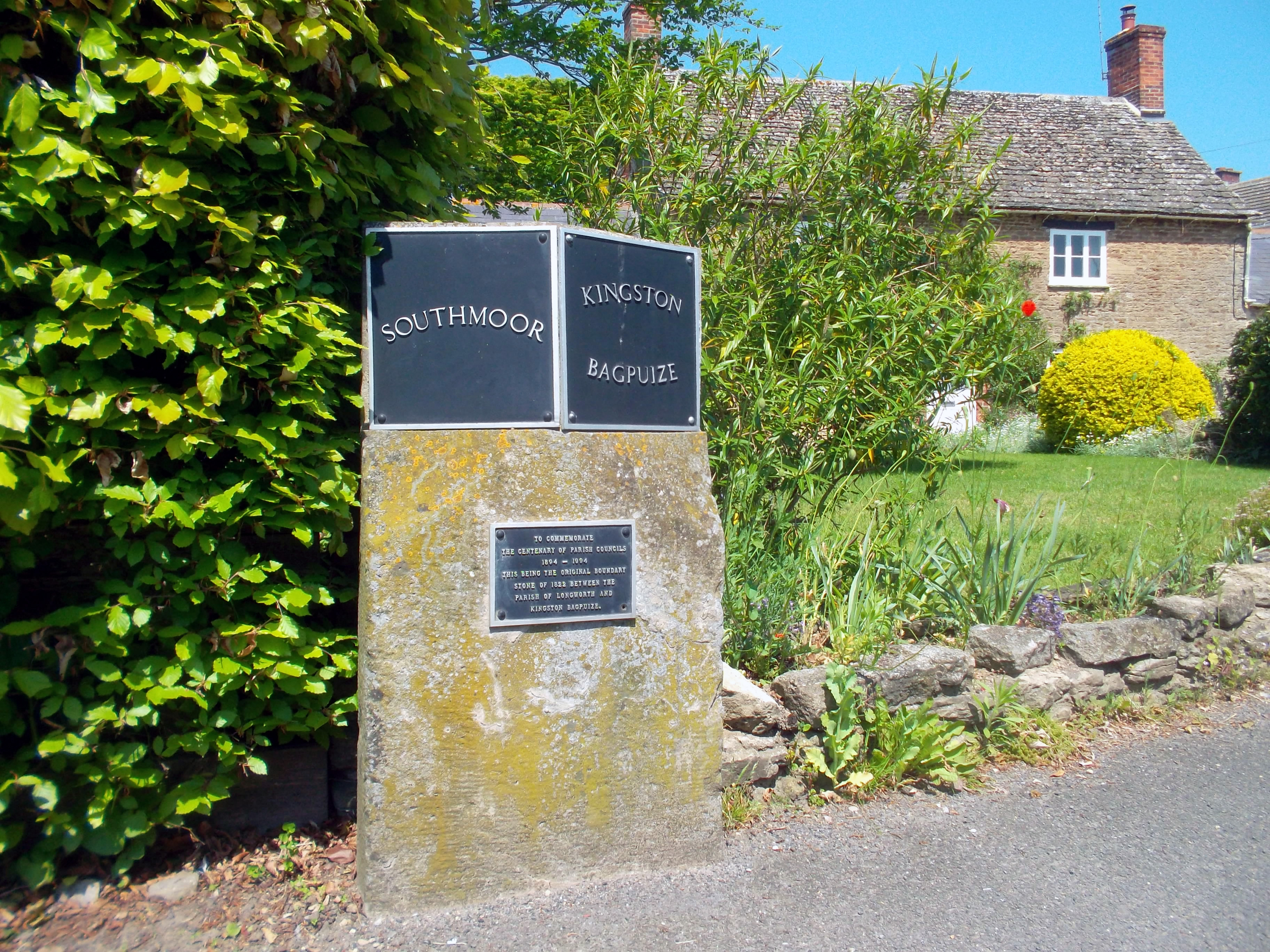
- The boundary stone on Faringdon Road

- Location within Oxfordshire
- Civil parish: Kingston Bagpuize with Southmoor
- District: Vale of White Horse
- Shire county: Oxfordshire
- Region: South East
- Country: England
- Sovereign state: United Kingdom
- Post town: Abingdon
- Postcode district: OX13
- Dialling code: 01865
- Police: Thames Valley
- Fire: Oxfordshire
- Ambulance: South Central
- UK Parliament: Witney

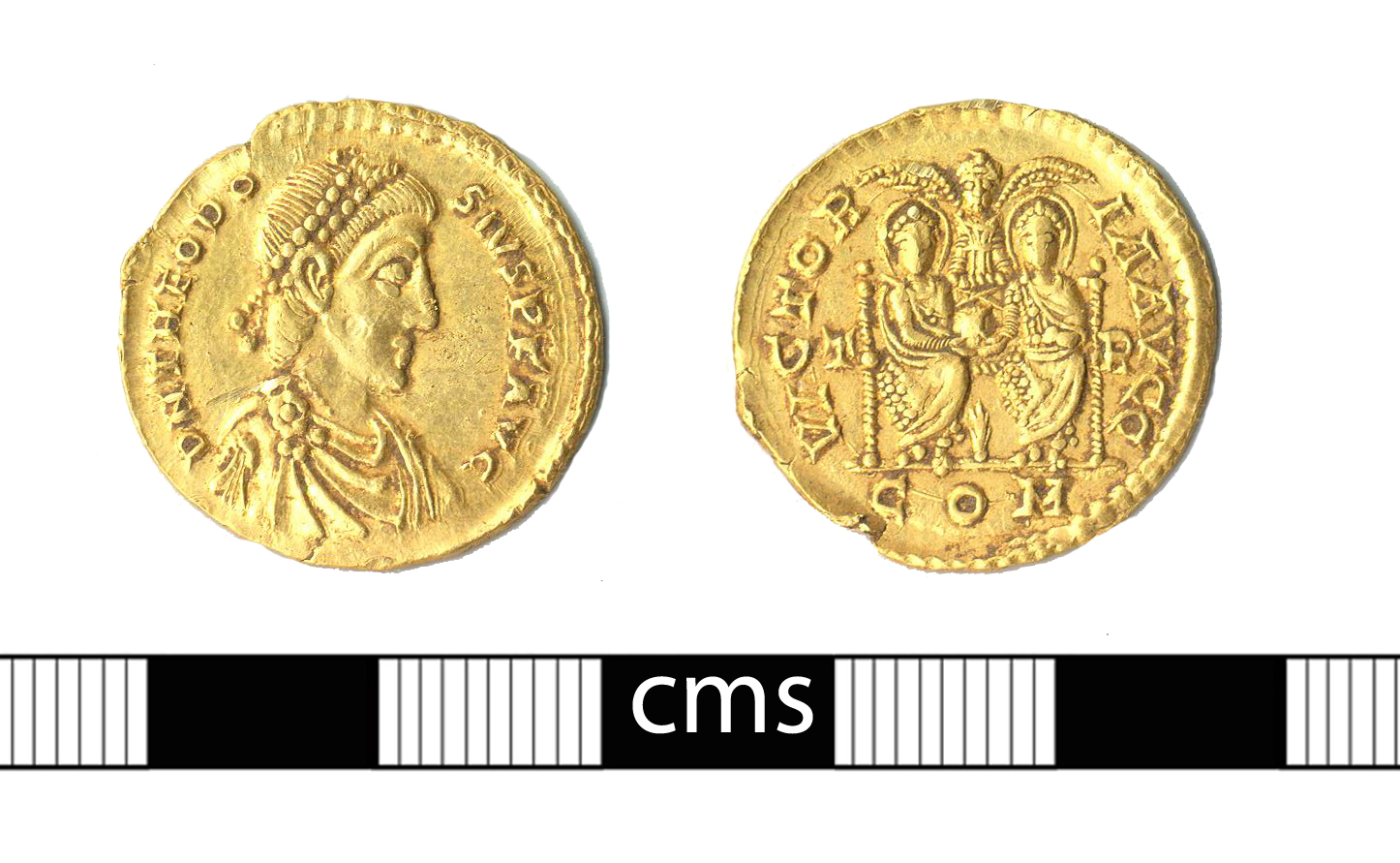
A gold solidus coin of Theodosius I, minted c. 388 – c. 392 found in the south of the civil parish, close to the River Ock in 2016

Kingston Bagpuize with Southmoor is a civil parish in the Vale of White Horse, Oxfordshire, England. The two principal settlements in the parish are the adjacent villages of Kingston Bagpuize and Southmoor. The parish extends north of the villages to the River Thames and south to the River Ock.

The parish was formed on 1 April 1971 by merging the two parishes of Kingston Bagpuize and Draycot Moor. From 1971 to 1974, the parish was in Berkshire, but in 1974 it was transferred to Oxfordshire. Within Kingston Bagpuize with Southmoor there are many amenities such as Aquarius (hairdressers), the Log Cabin (newsagents and sandwich shop), the Crossroads garage (car dealership and MOT/service station), a One Stop and a Co-op.
