= Æthelflæd Eneda =

First wife of King Edgar

- Died: circa 960s
- Spouse: Edgar, King of the English
- Issue: Edward the Martyr
- Father: Ordmær

Æthelflæd Eneda ('the White Duck'; died in the 960s) was an Anglo-Saxon noblewoman who was the first wife of Edgar, King of England, and likely the mother of Edward the Martyr.

== Life ==
=== Sources ===
She is attested by Eadmer's Life of St Dunstan, which says that Æthelflæd Eneda, daughter of Ordmær, ealdorman (dux) of the East Angles, became the lawful wife (coniunx legitima) of Edgar while he was king of the Mercians (between 957 and 959), and died 'a few years later'. Æthelflæd was thought to have been a strong, independent and well-educated lady.

This is echoed by the twelfth-century chronicle of John of Worcester, which reads: 'He [Edgar] had previously also had, by Æthelflæd the Fair, called Eneda (the daughter of the ealdorman, Ordmær), Edward, afterwards king and martyr…' The genealogical trees preceding the chronicle call Edgar's first wife 'Eneda, femina generosissima' ('a woman most nobly born').

A twelfth-century benefactor's list of the New Minster, Winchester, names Æthelflæd as the wife of Edgar. She gave land at Lingfield and Sanderstead to the minster.

=== Family ===
Cyril Hart proposes that Æthelflæd's father could have been Ordmær, the vir potens ('powerful man') who exchanged land at Hatfield with Edgar's foster-father Æthelstan Half-King according to the Liber Eliensis. Hart suggests that the chronicler may have been mistaken about Ordmær's rank as 'no ealdorman or thegn of this name witnesses in any of the numerous surviving royal diplomas of the tenth century.'

After Æthelflæd married Edgar, he became king of England at the age of sixteen in 959. Their son Edward was born about 962. Since Edgar began relationships with Wulfthryth and Ælfthryth so soon afterwards, marrying Ælfthryth in 964, Cyril Hart speculates that Æthelflæd must have died before then, although the birth dates of their respective children suggest that his 'liaison' with Wulfthryth may have overlapped with his marriage to Æthelflæd.

== Legitimacy of her marriage to Edgar ==
Edgar's subsequent wife Ælfthryth questioned the legitimacy of Edgar's marriage to Æthelflæd in order to present her sons, Edmund and Æthelred, as stronger candidates to the throne. This was a factor in the factional dispute between the supporters of Edward and Æthelred which ended in Edward's murder. Modern historians generally treat Æthelflæd as Edgar's wife, though in some way considered as less legitimate than his marriage to Ælfthryth.
