= Southmoor =

Village in Oxfordshire, England

Coordinates: 51.680°N 1.423°W

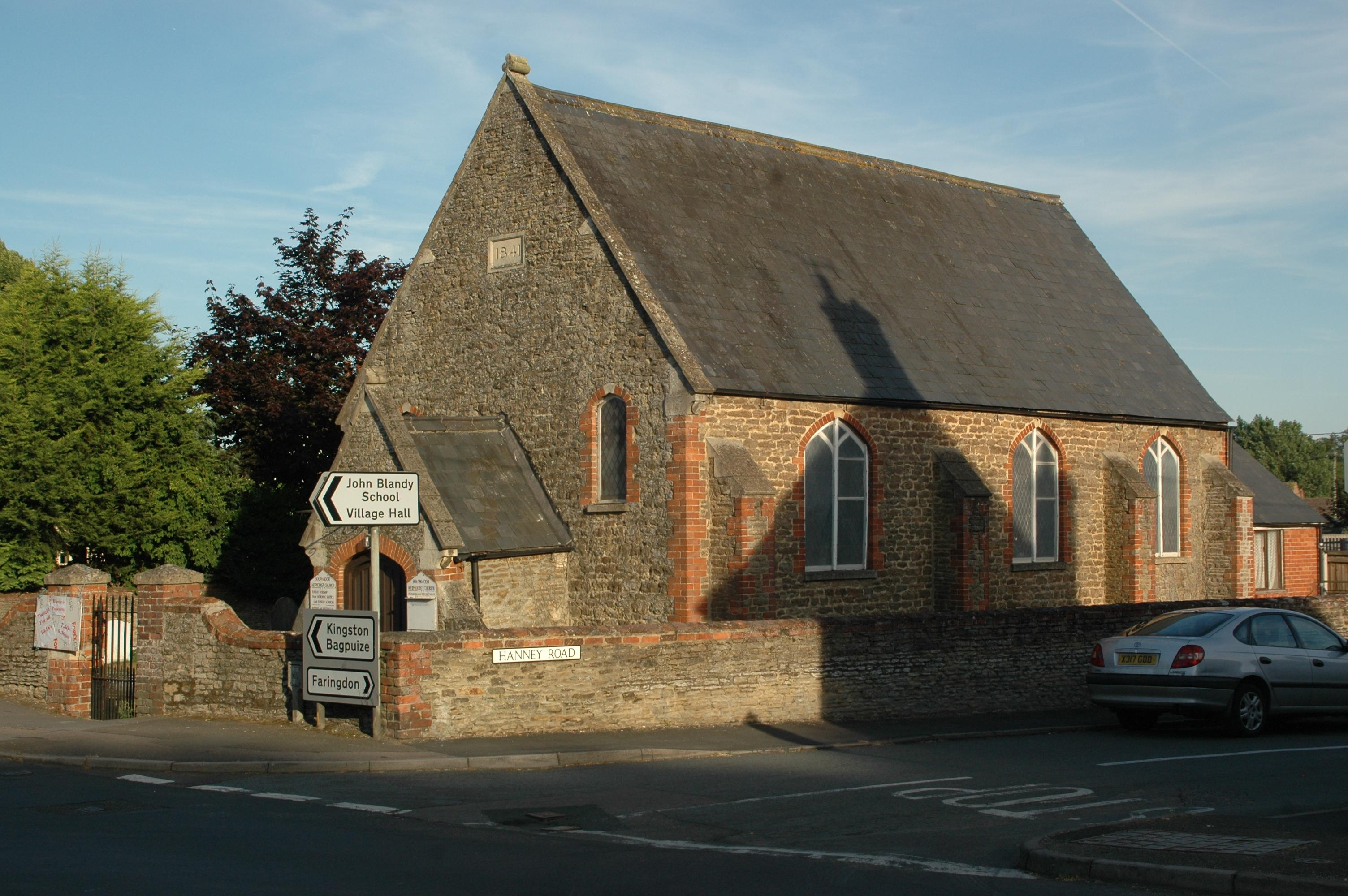
- Southmoor Methodist Church

- Location within Oxfordshire
- OS grid reference: SU3998
- Civil parish: Kingston Bagpuize with Southmoor
- District: Vale of White Horse
- Shire county: Oxfordshire
- Region: South East
- Country: England
- Sovereign state: United Kingdom
- Post town: Abingdon
- Postcode district: OX13
- Dialling code: 01865
- Police: Thames Valley
- Fire: Oxfordshire
- Ambulance: South Central
- UK Parliament: Witney
- Website: Kingston Bagpuize with Southmoor Community Website

Southmoor is a village in the civil parish of Kingston Bagpuize with Southmoor in the Vale of White Horse, Oxfordshire, England, about 6 miles (9.7 km) west of Abingdon. Historically part of Berkshire, the 1974 boundary changes transferred local government to Oxfordshire. Southmoor village is just south of the A420 between Oxford and Swindon.

== History ==
Southmoor was historically the southern part of the township of Draycot Moor (also spelt Draycott Moor), a manor of the ancient parish of Longworth. At the time of the Domesday Book the manor was held by Abingdon Abbey and Draycot Moor was listed as being in Berkshire. In 1574 the manor passed to St John's College, Oxford, who still own it today. John Blandy the Elder left money in his will of 1736 to found the Blandy educational charities. John Blandy the Younger left money to augment the charities in his will of 1791.

In 1874 a scheme was established under the Endowed Schools Act 1869 for the Blandy charities to provide an elementary school, scholarships, a public lending library and extra playground facilities. The school is now a primary school, John Blandy Voluntary Controlled School. A Wesleyan chapel was built in Southmoor in 1841. It was a Methodist church in the Wantage and Abingdon Methodist Circuit but is now a private dwelling. Draycot Moor became a separate civil parish in 1866. On 1 April 1971 the two parishes of Kingston Bagpuize and Draycot Moor merged into one civil parish forming Kingston Bagpuize with Southmoor.

== Amenities ==
Southmoor has a public house, the Waggon and Horses (Repainted blue in 2023). There is also a village hall. Southmoor's retailers are Gilt and Grain (Furniture store: converted from the previous Methodist Church), One Stop, the Co-op, Aquarius hairdressers and Crossroads garage. John Blandy VC Primary School teaches children from the ages of 4 to 11 and has about 180 pupils. It also has a nursery situated in the grounds. There is also a tennis club, scouts group, cricket club, drama group, village newspaper and many other activities and events.

== Transport ==
The village is served by Stagecoach and other smaller bus company services. There are services up to every 20 minutes to Oxford or Swindon on route S6 running Mondays to Saturdays and hourly services on Sundays. There are services to the towns Abingdon and Witney on the 15 service running Monday to Saturday. Frequent public transport facilities make Southmoor a convenient dormitory for working and shopping in Oxford.

== Famous resident ==
Dr. David Kelly, microbiologist and distinguished UN-sponsored weapons inspector, was a Southmoor resident; Dr. Kelly disappeared in July 2003, and the finding of his body soon afterwards on nearby Harrowdown Hill led to a public enquiry concluded by the Hutton Report.

== Sources ==
- Page, W.H.; Ditchfield, P.H., eds. (1924). Parishes:Kingston Bagpuize. Victoria County History. pp. 349–353.
