= R. R. Darlington =

English historian

Reginald Ralph Darlington (6 November 1903 – 30 May 1977) was an English historian.

== Early life and education ==
Born in 1903, Darlington was raised in Berkshire. He attended Ranelagh School in Bracknell before studying at the University College, Reading, to complete the external BA offered by the University of London; it was awarded in 1924. He remained a student at the college for three more years. There, he was taught by the eminent medievalists Frank and Doris Stenton, who were formative influences on him and became good friends. Under Stenton, Darlington completed a PhD on the Vita Wulfstani, which was awarded in 1930.

== Career, research and honours ==
Darlington had been appointed an assistant lecturer at Bedford College for Women in 1927. He was appointed to a readership at the University of London in 1936. In 1939, he moved to University College, Exeter, to take up its first professorship of history. He moved to Birkbeck College, London, in 1945 to be professor of history there; he remained there until retiring in 1969.

Darlington's key works include editions of medieval documents: William of Malmesbury's Vita Wulfstani (Camden Series, 1928), The Cartulary of Darley Abbey (1945), The Glapwell Charters (1957–59), (with P. M. Barnes and F. C. Slade) The Winchcombe Annals 1049–1181 (1962), and The Cartulary of Worcester Cathedral Priory (1968). His notes for an edition of the so-called chronicle of Florence of Worcester (now attributed to a monk called John) were destroyed in a bombing raid in 1942; although he was able to do much work on the project afterwards, he did not complete it before his death. His work was continued by Patrick McGurk and a full edition of The Chronicle of John of Worcester appeared in three volumes in the Oxford Medieval Texts series in 1995. Darlington also wrote articles and chapters, but no monograph, though his inaugural lecture at Birkbeck was published as Anglo-Norman Historians (1947). Darlington was elected a fellow of the Royal Historical Society (1928), the Society of Antiquaries (1946) and the British Academy (1954). He delivered the Creighton Lecture at the University of London in 1962, served as vice-president of the Pipe Roll Society from 1969 to 1976, and was elected a fellow of Birkbeck College in 1970. Darlington died on 30 May 1977.
