= Ælfstan =

Ælfstan is an Anglo-Saxon given name borne by several men

- Ælfstan (bishop of London) (died 995), Bishop of London
- Ælfstan (bishop of Rochester) (died 995), Bishop of Rochester
- Ælfstan (bishop of Ramsbury) (died 981), Bishop of Ramsbury
