= Family tree of English monarchs =

This is the family tree for monarchs of England (and Wales after 1282) from Alfred the Great to Elizabeth I, after which the Union of the Crowns joined the monarchs of Scotland and England. The House of Wessex family tree precedes this family tree and the family tree of the British royal family follows it.

For a simplified family tree see family tree of British monarchs (and alternative successions of the English and British crown for unsuccessful claimants' family trees).

(see List of monarchs of Wessex)

As to the medieval histories of Scotland and Wales:

- The family tree of Scottish monarchs covers the same period in Scotland and, equally as shown, directly precedes the family tree of the British royal family.
- The family tree of Welsh monarchs is relevant before the 1282 conquest by England.

== Key ==
Red borders indicate English monarchs	Bold borders indicate legitimate children of English monarchs	Bold red borders indicate British monarchs who were legitimate children of English monarchs

== Family tree ==
Wessex
Alfred the Great; 849–899; King of the West Saxons from 871; King of the Anglo-Saxons r. c. 886 – 899	Ealhswith d. 902
Æthelflæd c. 870–918; Lady of the Mercians m. Æthelred d. 911; Lord of the Mercians	Ecgwynn; 890s	Edward the Elder c. 874/877-924; King of the Anglo-Saxons r. 899–924	Eadgifu of Kent c. 903–966	Ælfflæd c. 899-919	Æthelweard d. 920 or 922	Ælfthryth of Wessex; 877–929 m. Baldwin II c. 865–918; Margrave of Flanders
Æthelstan c. 893/895–939; King of the Anglo-Saxons r. 924–927; King of the English, Disputed r. 927–939	Ælfgifu of Shaftesbury; Saint Elgiva d. 944	Edmund I 921–946; King of the English r. 939–946	Æthelflæd of Damerham; 944-991	Eadred; 923–955; King of the English r. 946–955	Eadburh of Winchester d. 960	Also: Ælfweard of Wessex c. 902–924 Edwin d. 933	Charles; 879–929; King of Western Francia and of Lotharingia	Eadgifu of Wessex; 902–after 955	Herbert the old 910–980/985; Count of Omois	Eadgyth / Edith / Ædgyth; 910–946 m. Otto; 912–973; Holy Roman Emperor	Eadhild d. 937 m. Hugh the Great; 898–956; Duke of the Franks
Knýtlinga	Normandy
Ælfgifu	Eadwig; All-Fair d. 959; King of England r. 955–959	Æthelflæd	Edgar I the Peaceful c. 943–975; King of the English r. 959–975	Ælfthryth c. 945–1000/1001	Sigrid the Haughty (?)	Sweyn Forkbeard; Forkbeard; 963–1014; King of the English r. 1013–1014	Gunhild of Wenden c. 960–1014	Richard; 933–996; Duke of Normandy
Edward the Martyr c. 962–978; King of England r. 975–978	Edmund c. 966 – c. 970	Ælfgifu of York fl. c. 970–1002	Æthelred the Unready c. 966–1016; King of the English r. 978–1013 r. 1014–1016	Emma of Normandy c. 985–1052	Cnut the Great c. 985/995–1035; King of England r. 1016–1035	Ælfgifu of Northampton c. 990–after 1040	also: Estrid Svendsdatter; 990/997–1057/1073 Harald c. 996–998–c. 1018; King of Denmark	Richard; 963–1026; Duke of Normandy
Godwin
Edmund II; Ironside c. 990–1016; King of the English r. 1016	Ealdgyth c. 992-after 1016	also: Æthelstan Ætheling; 980s–1014 Eadred Ætheling d. c. 1012 Eadwig Ætheling d. 1017	Godwin; 1001–1053; Earl of Wessex	Harthacnut c. 1018–1042; King of the English r. 1040–1042	Gunhilda of Denmark c. 1020–1038; Queen of Germany	Svein; Knutsson c. 1016–1035; King of Norway	Harold I Harefoot c. 1015–1040; King of the English r. 1035/1037–1040
Edmund Ætheling c. 1015/1017–a. 1054	Edward the Exile; 1016–1057 m. Agatha a. 1054–after 1070	Gruffudd ap Llywelyn c. 1010–1063; King of Wales	Ealdgyth of Mercia fl. 1057 – c. 1066	Harold II; Godwinson c. 1022–1066; King of the English r. 1066	Edith of Wessex c. 1025–1075	Edward the Confessor the Confessor; 1003/1005–1066; King of the English r. 1042–1066	also: Alfred Aetheling d. 1036 Godgifu; 1004–c. 1047	Herleva c. 1003 – c. 1050	Robert; 1000–1035; Duke of Normandy
Edgar II the Ætheling c. 1051–1126; King of England, Disputed r. 1066	Cristina d. c. 1100	Margaret of Wessex c. 1045–1093	Malcolm c. 1031–1093; King of Scots	Gytha of Wessex c. 1053/1061 – c. 1098 or 1107	Gunhild of Wessex fl. 1066 – c. 1093	Matilda of Flanders c. 1031–1083	William I the Conqueror c. 1028–1087; King of England r. 1066–1087
Fulk the Younger; 1089/1092–1143; Count of Anjou; King of Jerusalem	Robert; Curthose c. 1054–1134; Duke of Normandy m. Sibylla of Conversano d. 1103	also: Richard of Normandy c. 1054 – c. 1070 Adeliza of Normandy c. 1055–a. 1113 Cecilia of Normandy c. 1056–1126	William II; Rufus c. 1056–1100; King of England r. 1087–1100	also: Agatha of Normandy c. 1064 – c. 1080 Constance of Normandy c. 1066–1090	Stephen Henry c. 1045–1102; Count of Blois	Adela of Normandy c. 1067–1137	Adeliza of Louvain; 1103–1151	Henry I Beauclerc c. 1068–1135; King of England r. 1100–1135	Matilda of Scotland c. 1080–1118	Mary of Scotland; 1082–1116 m. Eustace c. 1050–c. 1125 of Boulogne
Blois	Plantagenet / Angevin
William Clito; Count of Flanders; 1102–1128	Sibylla of Anjou c. 1112–1165	Stephen of Blois c. 1092–1154; King of England r. 1135–1141 r. 1141–1154	Matilda c. 1105–1152; Countess of Boulogne	Geoffrey; Plantagenet; 1113–1151; Count of Anjou	Matilda c. 1102–1167; Queen of England, Disputed r. 1141	Henry; 1086–1125; Holy Roman Emperor	Matilda of Anjou c. 1111–1154	William Adelin; 1103–1120; Duke of Normandy
Eustace c. 1129–1153; Count of Boulogne m. Constance of France; 1124–1176	Marie; 1136–1182; Countess of Boulogne suo jure	Matthew of Alsace c. 1137–1173; Count of Boulogne jure uxoris	William c. 1137–1159; Count of Boulogne	Eleanor c. 1122–1204; Duchess of Aquitaine suo jure	Henry II; FitzEmpress; 1133–1189; King of England r. 1154–1189	Geoffrey; FitzEmpress; 1134–1158; Count of Nantes William; FitzEmpress; 1136–1163/1164; Viscount of Dieppe
William IX; 1153–1156; Count of Poitiers	Henry the Young King; 1155–1183; Duke of Normandy, Count of Anjou and Maine	Margaret of France; 1157–1197	Matilda of England; 1156–1189 m. Henry; The Lion; 1129–1195; Duke of Saxony and of Bavaria	Richard I the Lionheart; 1157–1199; King of England r. 1189–1199	Berengaria of Navarre c. 1165–1230	Isabella of Angoulême; 1188–1246	John; Lackland; 1166–1216; King of England r. 1199–1216	Isabel c. 1173–1217; Countess of Gloucester	Geoffrey; 1158–1186; Duke of Brittany m. Constance; 1161–1201	Eleanor of England; 1162–1214 m. Alfonso; 1155–1214; King of Castile	Joan of England; 1165–1199 m. Raymond; 1156–1222; Count of Toulouse
Plantagenet	(4 children)	(12 children)	(3 children)
Eleanor of Provence c. 1223–1291	Henry III; 1207–1272; King of England r. 1216–1272	Isabel Marshal; 1200–1240	Richard; 1209–1272; Earl of Cornwall	Sanchia of Provence c. 1228–1261	Joan of England; 1210–1238 m. Alexander; 1198–1249; King of Scotland	Isabella of England; 1214–1241 m. Frederick; 1194–1250; Holy Roman Emperor	Simon de Montfort; 1208–1265; Earl of Leicester; Earl of Chester	Eleanor of England; 1215–1275	William Marshal; 1190–1231; Earl of Pembroke
Beatrice of England; 1242–1275	John; 1239–1305; Duke of Brittany	Aveline de Forz; 1259–1274; Countess of Aumale & Lady of Holderness	Edmund; Crouchback; 1245–1296; Earl of Lancaster	Blanche of Artois; 1248–1302; Queen of Navarre and Countess of Champagne	Eleanor of Castile; 1241–1290	Edward I King of England; 1239–1307 r. 1272–1307	Margare of France; 1279–1318	Katherine; 1253–1257	Margaret of England; 1240–1275	Alexander; 1241–1286; King of Scotland
Eleanor of England; 1269–1298 m. Henry; 1259–1302; Count of Bar	Joan of Acre; Princess of England; 1272–1307 m1. Gilbert de Clare; 1243–1295; Earl of Hertford and of Gloucester m2. Ralph de Monthermer c. 1270–1325; Earl of Gloucester, Hertford, and Atholl	Margaret of England; 1275–1333 m. John; 1275–1312; Duke of Brabant, Lothier and Limburg	Elizabeth of Rhuddlan; 1282–1316 m1. John; 1284–1299; Count of Holland m2. Humphrey de Bohun; 1276–1322; Earl of Hereford	Edward II; 1284–1327; King of England r. 1307–1327 m. Isabella of France c. 1295–1358	Also: Katherine c. 1261–1264 Joanna; 1265 John; 1266–1271 Henry of England; 1268–1274	Also: Alphonso; 1273–1284; Earl of Chester Berengaria; 1276–1278 Mary of Woodstock; 1279–c. 1332	Thomas of Brotherton; 1300–1338; Earl of Norfolk m1. Alice Hayles m2. Mary Braose	Margaret Wake c. 1297–1349; Baroness Wake of Liddell	Edmund of Woodstock; 1301–1330; Earl of Kent	Eleanor; 1306–1311
Philippa of Hainault; 1314–1369	Edward III; 1312–1377; King of England r. 1327–1377	John of Eltham; 1316–1336; Earl of Cornwall	Eleanor of Woodstock; 1318–1355	Reginald c. 1295–1343; Duke of Guelders	Joan of the Tower; 1321–1362	David; 1324–1371; King of Scotland
Isabella of England; 1332–1379/1382	Enguerrand de Coucy; 1340–1397; Lord of Coucy, Earl of Bedford	Also: William of Hatfield; 1337 William of Windsor; 1348 Joan of England; 1335–1348	Elizabeth de Burgh; 1332–1363; Countess of Ulster, Baroness of Connaught	Lionel of Antwerp; 1338–1368; Duke of Clarence	Violante (Jolantha) Visconti; 1354–1386	Mary of Waltham; 1344–1362	John the Conqueror; 1339–1399; Duke of Brittany	Margaret of England; 1346–1361	John Hastings; 1347–1375; Earl of Pembroke	Thomas of Woodstock; 1355–1397; Duke of Gloucester m. Eleanor de Bohun c. 1366–1399
Lancaster
Philippa of Clarence; 1355–1382	Isabella of Castile c. 1355–1392	Edmund of Langley; 1341–1402; Duke of York	Joan Holland c. 1380–1434	Edward of Woodstock; The Black Prince; 1330–1376; Count of Kent	Joan; 1328–1385; Countess of Kent	m.1 Blanche of Lancaster; 1342–1368	John of Gaunt; 1340–1399; Duke of Lancaster	m.2 Constance of Castile; 1354–1394	m.3 Katherine Swynford; 1350–1403
Roger Mortimer; 1374–1398; Earl of March, Earl of Ulster	Edward; 1373–1415; Duke of York	Constance of York c. 1374–1416	Richard II; 1367–1400; King of England r. 1377–1399	John Holland c. 1352–1400; Duke of Exeter	Elizabeth of Lancaster; 1363–1426	Philippa of Lancaster; 1360–1415	Mary de Bohun c. 1368–1394; Countess of Northampton & of Derby	Henry IV; 1366–1413; King of England r. 1399–1413	Joan of Navarre c. 1370–1437
Anne de Mortimer; 1390–1411	Richard of Conisburgh c. 1375–1415; Earl of Cambridge	Blanche of England & of Lancaster; 1392–1409 m. Louis; 1378–1436; Elector Palatine	Anne of Burgundy; 1404–1432	John of Lancaster; 1389–1435; Duke of Bedford	Jacquetta of Luxembourg; 1415/1416–1472	Richard Woodville; 1405–1469; Earl Rivers	Henry V 1386–1422; King of England r. 1413–1422	Catherine of Valois; 1401–1437	Owen Tudor c. 1392–1461
Thomas of Lancaster; 1387–1421; Duke of Clarence	Jacqueline; 1401–1436; Countess of Hainaut	Humphrey of Lancaster; 1390–1447; Duke of Gloucester	Eleanor Cobham c. 1400–1452	Philippa of England & of Lancaster; 1394–1430	Eric of Pomerania; 1381–1459; King of Denmark	Ralph Neville c. 1364–1425; Earl of Westmorland	Joan Beaufort c. 1379–1440	John Beaufort c. 1371–1410; Earl of Somerset m. Margaret Holland; 1385–1439
Richard of York; 1411–1460; Duke of York	Cecily Neville; 1415–1495	York	Margaret of Anjou; 1430–1482	Henry VI; 1421–1471; King of England r. 1422–1461 r. 1470–1471	John Beaufort; 1403–1444; Duke of Somerset m. Margaret Beauchamp of Bletso; 1405/1406–1482
Anne Neville; 1456–1485	Richard III; 1452–1485; King of England r. 1483–1485	Isabella Neville; 1451–1476	George Plantagenet; 1449–1478; Duke of Clarence	Margaret of York; 1446–1503	Charles the Bold; 1433–1477; Duke of Burgundy	Edward IV; 1442–1483; King of England r. 1461–1470 r. 1471–1483	Elizabeth Woodville c. 1437–1492	Edward of Westminster; 1453–1471; Prince of Wales	Tudor	Edmund Tudor; 1430–1456; Earl of Richmond	Margaret Beaufort; 1441/1443–1509
Edward of Middleham, Prince of Wales c. 1473–1484	Edward V 1470–1483; King of England r. 1483	Cecily of York; 1469–1507 m1. Ralph Scrope of Upsall m2. John Welles c. 1450–1498; Viscount Welles m3. Thomas Kymbe	Anne of York; 1475–1511; Lady Howard	Thomas Howard; 1473–1554; Duke of Norfolk	Catherine of York; 1479–1527	William Courtenay; 1475–1511; Earl of Devon	Also: Mary of York; 1467–1482 Margaret of York; 1472 Richard of Shrewsbury; 1473–1483; Duke of York Bridget of York; 1480–1517	Elizabeth of York; 1466–1503	Henry VII; 1457–1509; King of England r. 1485–1509
m1. James; 1473–1513; King of Scotland	Margaret Tudor; 1489–1541	m2. Archibald Douglas c. 1489–1557; Earl of Angus	m3. Henry Stewart c. 1495–1552; Lord Methven	Elizabeth Tudor; 1492–1495	Louis XII; 1462–1515; King of France	Mary Tudor; 1496–1533	Charles Brandon c. 1484–1545; Duke of Suffolk	Edmund Tudor; 1499–1500; Duke of Somerset	Katherine Tudor; 1503
Grey
Arthur Tudor; 1486–1502; Prince of Wales	Catherine of Aragon; 1485–1536	Henry VIII; 1491–1547; King of England r. 1509–1547	Anne Boleyn; 1501/1507–1536	Jane Seymour c. 1508–1537	m.4 Anne of Cleves; 1515–1557 m.5 Catherine Howard; 1518/1524–1542 m.6 Catherine Parr; 1512–1548	Frances Brandon; 1517–1559	Henry Grey; 1517–1554; Duke of Suffolk
Habsburg
James V 1512–1542; King of Scotland m. Mary of Guise; 1515–1560	Margaret Douglas; 1515–1578 m. Matthew Stewart; 1516–1571; Earl of Lennox	Mary I 1516–1558; Queen of England r. 1553–1558	Philip II (Note: Title as Prince consort of England); 1527–1598; King of Spain; Prince consort Of England; Jure uxoris r. 1553–1558	Henry FitzRoy; 1519–1536; Duke of Richmond and Somerset	Elizabeth I 1533–1603; Queen of England r. 1558–1603	Edward VI; 1537–1553; King of England r. 1547–1553	Lord Guildford Dudley c. 1535–1554	Lady Jane Grey; 1536/1537–1554; Queen of England, Disputed r. 1553	Katherine Grey; 1540–1568; Lady Herbert	Lady Mary Grey; 1545–1578
m1. Francis II; 1544–1560; King of France m3. James Hepburn c. 1534–1578; Earl of Bothwell	Mary; 1542–1587; Queen of Scots	m2. Henry Stuart, Lord Darnley; 1545–1567; Duke of Orkney
House of Stuart

== See also ==
- History of the English monarchy
- Lists of monarchs in the British Isles
- Simplified English and British monarchs family tree
