= Edith of Polesworth =

Anglo-Saxon abbess

Saint Edith of Polesworth (Eadgyth)
- Born: England
- Died: 10th century
- Venerated in: Catholic Church, Anglicanism
- Major shrine: Tamworth, Staffordshire, England
- Feast: 15 July

Saint Edith of Polesworth (also known as Editha or Eadgyth; died ?c. 960s) was an Anglo-Saxon abbess venerated in the Kingdom of Mercia. She is traditionally associated with Polesworth Abbey in Warwickshire and the royal centre of Tamworth, Staffordshire. Though widely revered as a saint, her historical identity and period of activity (floruit) remain uncertain.

Later medieval sources offer conflicting accounts of her lineage. Some traditions identify her as a daughter of King Edward the Elder (r. 899–924), possibly by his first wife Ecgwynn or second wife Ælfflæd, while others claim she was the daughter of Ecgberht, King of Wessex (r. 802–839). A 12th-century tradition links her to the royal marriage diplomacy of King Æthelstan, suggesting she may have been wed to Sihtric Cáech, the Norse-Gaelic king of Northumbria, before retiring to religious life.

Edith's feast date, and thus probably her death day, was 15 July, and her cult was especially prominent in the English Midlands, where several churches bear her name.

== Identity ==
Edith (Ealdgyth) is included in the first section of the late Old English saints' list known as Secgan, which locates her burial place at Polesworth. The question of St Edith's historical identity is fraught with difficulties.

=== As sister to a West-Saxon king ===
The tradition which was written down at the monastery of Bury St Edmunds in the 12th century and was later re-told by Roger of Wendover (d. 1236) and Matthew Paris (d. 1259) asserts that she was a sister of King Æthelstan, who gave her in marriage to Sihtric Cáech, a Hiberno-Scandinavian king of southern Northumbria and Dublin. It then suggests that the marriage was never consummated. When Sihtric broke his side of the agreement by renouncing the Christian religion and died soon thereafter, she returned south and founded a nunnery at Polesworth, not far from the Mercian royal seat at Tamworth, spending the rest of her life as a devout nun and virgin.

The story appears to take its cue from an earlier source, the D-version of the Anglo-Saxon Chronicle, which confirms that on 30 January 926 King Æthelstan married his sister to Sihtric (d. 927) and attended the wedding feast at the Mercian royal centre of Tamworth. The Chronicle, however, gives no name. Reporting on the same event in the early part of the 12th century, William of Malmesbury identified her as a daughter of Edward the Elder and Ecgwynn, and therefore a full-blooded sister to Æthelstan, but says that he was unable to discover her name in any of the sources available to him. A variant version of the Bury tradition, which locates her burial place at Tamworth rather than Polesworth, identifies this Edith as a daughter of Ælfflæd, Edward's second wife, and hence Æthelstan's half-sister. However, another late source drawing upon earlier material, the early 13th-century Chronicle of John of Wallingford, names Sihtric's wife Orgiue.

These late, contradictory statements have garnered a mixed response from modern historians. Some scholars favour Roger's identification or at least the possibility that her name was Eadgyth/Edith. Alan Thacker, for instance, states that "given the strong Mercian connections of Æthelstan himself, it is not at all unlikely that such a woman, if repudiated, should have ended her days in a community in the former heartlands of the Mercian royal family. Perhaps, like Æthelstan, she had been brought up at the Mercian court." Barbara Yorke, however, argues that the name Eadgyth is unlikely to belong to two of Edward's daughters at the same time, the other being a daughter by Ælfflæd.

A slightly earlier if largely legendary source which potentially casts some light on traditions surrounding St Edith is Conchubran's Life of Saint Modwenna, a female hermit who supposedly lived near Burton-on-Trent. The text, written in the early 11th century, mentions a sister of King Alfred by the name of Ite, a nun who served as the saint's tutor and had a maidservant called Osid. Although an Irish nun called St Ita was active in the 7th century, Ite's name has been interpreted as "almost certainly a garbling of Edith" and that of Osid a rendering of Osgyth.

=== As early Mercian saint ===
Yorke prefers to identify the historical figure of Edith with an earlier namesake instead. The saint's inclusion in Secgan, grouped as she is with other early saints buried near rivers, may be taken as evidence for the hypothesis that she was a Mercian saint who flourished in the 7th or 8th century. According to Alan Thacker, on the other hand, the entry in Secgan may also be a later addition, along with at least two other items which seem to reflect interests peculiar to Æthelstan's time.

== Later traditions ==
The saint is commemorated in a number of churches around the Midlands, the most notable of these being Polesworth Abbey and the Collegiate Church of Tamworth, which bears her name. Other churches dedicated to St Edith include Church Eaton in Staffordshire, St Editha's Church, Amington, St Edith's Church in Monks Kirby, Warwickshire as well as a number of churches in Lincolnshire.

== See also ==
- Church of St Editha, Tamworth, a Grade I listed building
- Eadgyth of Aylesbury
- Edith of Wilton
