= Frithestan =

10th-century Bishop of Winchester

- Bishop of Winchester
- Appointed: 909
- Term ended: resigned between 23 March and 29 May 931
- Predecessor: Denewulf
- Successor: Byrnstan

Orders
- Consecration: 909 by Plegmund

Personal details
- Died: 932 or 933 Winchester
- Denomination: Christian

Frithestan (or Frithustan) was the Anglo-Saxon Bishop of Winchester from 909 until his resignation in 931.

Frithestan is first recorded in 904 as a deacon who witnessed two charters in which King Edward the Elder granted land to the Old Minster, Winchester. According to William of Malmesbury, he was one of seven bishops who were consecrated on the same day in 909 by Plegmund, the Archbishop of Canterbury. Shortly after he was appointed, the diocese of Winchester was divided, and the area which is now Wiltshire and Berkshire was transferred to the new bishopric of Ramsbury.

When King Edward died in July 924, Ælfweard, his eldest son by his second wife Ælfflæd, was elected king by the nobles of Wessex at Winchester, while Æthelstan, Edward's son by his first wife Ecgwynn, was elected in Mercia. Ælfweard died within four weeks of his father, but resistance to Æthelstan centred on Winchester appears to have continued, and Frithestan was not present when Æthelstan was crowned king on 4 September 925.

Frithestan first witnessed a charter of Æthelstan's in April 928, and thereafter he witnessed regularly until his resignation in 931, but he always attested in a lower position than his seniority would normally have entitled him to. In 1827, St Cuthbert's tomb at Durham was opened, and among the objects found was a stole and maniple which appear from inscriptions on them to have been given by Queen Ælfflæd to Bishop Frithestan, presumably before Edward put her aside to marry his third wife in about 919. Æthelstan probably took them from Winchester to donate to Cuthbert's tomb, another indication of his bad relations with Frithestan.

Frithestan was remembered at Winchester for establishing good relations between the Old and New Minsters. One of the regulations he laid down was that when a priest of either minster died, members of both would take part in the funeral observances.

Frithestan resigned between 23 March and 29 May 931, and died in 932 or 933. He was buried in the Old Minster, but by William of Malmesbury's day in the twelfth century the location of his tomb had already been lost. There was some attempt to develop a cult of him as a saint at Winchester, and he was listed in some later martyrologies, but his cult never became popular. His feast day is 10 September.

== Citations ==
Christian titles
Preceded by Denewulf	Bishop of Winchester; 909–931	Succeeded by Byrnstan
