= Ecgwynn =

Consort of Edward the Elder

- Floruit: 890s
- Spouse: Edward the Elder
- Issue: Æthelstan, King of England; Edith of Polesworth (possibly)

Ecgwynn (also spelled Ecgwynna; Old English: Eċġwynn, meaning “sword joy”;fl. 890s) was the first known consort of Edward the Elder, who reigned as King of the English from 899 to 924. She was the mother of Æthelstan (r. 924–939), the first monarch to rule a unified England, and is also believed to have had a daughter who married Sitric Cáech, Norse king of Dublin, Ireland and Northumbria.

Virtually nothing is known about Ecgwynn’s origins or personal life and her name is absent from all contemporary records and does not appear in any surviving sources until after the Norman Conquest. The earliest known reference comes from William of Malmesbury, who Latinized her name as Egwinna and who is in fact the principal source for her existence.

== Marriage and children ==
According to William of Malmesbury, Æthelstan was thirty years old when he became king in 924, placing his birth around 894 and suggesting that Ecgwynn’s union with Edward the Elder occurred circa 893. By this time, Edward had reached majority, and one of his priorities would have been to secure the continuation of Alfred's line.

No contemporary sources record what became of Ecgwynn after Æthelstan’s birth, but two developments are particularly relevant. First, William notes that, at Alfred’s direction, Æthelstan was sent to be raised at the Mercian court under the care of his aunt Æthelflæd, Lady of the Mercians. Second, by 901, Edward had married Ælfflæd, daughter of Ealdorman Æthelhelm.

The reasons behind this transition remain uncertain. It is possible that Ecgwynn had died by 899, prompting Edward to seek a new consort. Alternatively, the first marriage may have lacked the political weight necessary to reinforce Edward’s position as king of the English. Some scholars suggest that Alfred himself may have arranged Edward’s initial marriage, and that his death in 899 allowed Edward and his counsellors room to follow a different course.

=== An anonymous daughter ===
The Anglo-Saxon Chronicle records that King Æthelstan arranged the marriage of his sister to Sitric Cáech (d. 927), Norse king of Northumbria and Dublin. The wedding took place on 30 January 926 at Tamworth, a prominent Mercian royal center.

According to William of Malmesbury, the bride was a daughter of Ecgwynn, though he was unable to discover her name from any of the sources available to him. Only later medieval writers offer possible identifications, though their reliability remains uncertain.

- Roger of Wendover (d. 1236) and Matthew Paris (d. 1259) proposed that she was St Edith (Eadgyth), who, according to the Old English saints’ list Secgan, was buried at the nunnery of Polesworth in Warwickshire, not far from Tamworth.
- The Chronicle of John of Wallingford, compiled in the early 13th century from earlier material, names Sitric’s wife as Orgiue, possibly a corruption of Eadgifu or Eadgyth, and claims that their son was Olaf, king of Northumbria identified with the Norse-Gaelic ruler Amlaíb Cuarán.

These accounts have received mixed evaluations from modern historians. Some scholars accept the possibility that her name was Eadgyth, or at least support Roger’s identification. However, historian Barbara Yorke argues that the name Eadgyth is unlikely to have belonged to two daughters of Edward the Elder, given that another daughter by Ælfflæd bore the same name.Yorke instead suggests that Edith of Polesworth may have been an earlier namesake, unrelated to Ecgwynn.

== Family background ==
Ecgwynn's own family background and social status cannot be identified with any certainty. What little evidence there is appears in the main to be coloured by a controversy which surrounded Æthelstan's succession, contested as it probably was by supporters of Edward's sons by Ælfflæd.

=== Succession ===
William of Malmesbury claims that Alfred had intended the throne to go to Æthelstan, and to give ceremonial expression to his grandson's status as successor, personally invested him with a cloak, belt and sword. Moreover, Alfred is said to have ensured his education at the Mercian court of his aunt Æthelflæd. A Latin acrostic poem, possibly contemporary (c. 893/4 x 899), in which a young Æthelstan appears to be addressed as future ruler, would seem to lend credence to the idea that Æthelstan's eligibility for kingship was already acknowledged in the 890s.

However, Edward may have entertained other plans when his second wife Ælfflaed had borne him sons. While his intentions are unknown, it appears to have been Ælfweard, Edward's eldest son by Ælfflæd, who on 17 July 924 succeeded his late father in Wessex, while the Mercians chose Æthelstan for their king. By some mishap, Ælfweard died within a month and Wessex was ceded to Æthelstan, who thereby obtained his father's entire kingdom. His accession in Wessex, however, met with considerable resistance. One indication of this is that his coronation at Kingston upon Thames was delayed until 4 December the following year (925). William notes explicitly that "a certain Ælfred" at Winchester opposed the succession on grounds that Æthelstan was a concubine's son and hence an illegitimate son. Such allegations seem to have served the interests of a royal contender, especially Edwin, Ælfflæd's eldest surviving son. In a royal charter for a thegn (minister) called Ælfred, Edwin subscribes as cliton "ætheling", witnessing after Æthelstan, which implies that he was recognised as his heir to the throne. The circumstances of his death in 933 suggest that any peaceful understanding which may have existed between the half-brothers had come to an end. The Annals of St. Bertin compiled by Folcuin the Deacon note laconically that Edwin, "driven by some disturbance in his kingdom," attempted to sail to the continent, but was caught in a storm and drowned.

=== Status ===
The written and oral sources consulted by William of Malmesbury for his accounts of Æthelstan's parentage seem to reflect the political stances which polarised during these succession struggle(s). To begin with, there is the account favoured by William himself. Possibly paraphrasing from a non-contemporary Latin poem in praise of Æthelstan, he describes Ecgwynn as “a distinguished woman” (illustris femina) and John of Worcester follows suit, giving the similar description "a very noble woman" (mulier nobilissima).

William was also aware of rumours (though he rejected them) that Æthelstan's mother was a concubine, as propagated by “a certain Ælfred” who headed a group opposed to the succession. By the early 12th century, such rumours had given rise to fully-fledged popular traditions which reduced her to a low-born mistress, if still one of noble appearance. William cites an anecdote about Æthelstan's conception which he overheard from popular song (cantilena) and to which he gave only little credence himself. One day, when out of old affection, Edward the Elder visited his former nurse (nutrix), a reeve's wife, he met a beautiful shepherd's daughter who had been raised like a noblewoman. Edward slept with the unnamed girl, who bore him the future king called Æthelstan.

These slurs may represent a later development of stories in favour of Ælfflæd's sons, but there is evidence to suggest that the status difference between Edward's first two wives had been an issue at an earlier stage. A distant but near-contemporary poet writing in the 960s, Hrotsvitha of Gandersheim, tells that Æthelstan's mother was lower in status (generis satis inferioris) than Ælfflæd, whose daughter Eadgyth married Otto I. Since she wrote her Life in praise of Otto I, Eadgyth and their descendants, presumably based on sources sympathetic to the latter, not a small degree of bias may be assumed. On the other hand, if Ecgwynn had been set aside in favour of Ælfflæd, then the political importance of the latter's family may have played a large part.

Further near-contemporary evidence comes only indirectly by inference from later kinsmen whose precise connectedness is impossible to specify. According to his first biographer, Dunstan, Archbishop of Canterbury, was related to a certain Æthelflæd, a lady of royal rank who was herself a niece of King Æthelstan, to Bishop Ælfheah of Winchester, to Bishop Cynesige of Lichfield, and to various men at court (including his brother Wulfric). Dunstan's father Heorstan, who lived near the “royal island” of Glastonbury, cannot be shown to have been a prominent figure in the kingdom, although sources for Edward's reign are notoriously scanty. Since Æthelstan, Dunstan and Heorstan all share the rare onomastic element -stan, it has been tentatively suggested that they derived their kinship through Ecgwynn.
