= Eadhild =

English princess, the second wife of Hugh, duke of the Franks

- Born: Unknown
- Died: c. 937
- Spouse: Hugh the Great
- Father: Edward the Elder
- Mother: Ælfflæd

Eadhild (died 937) was an English princess, the second wife of Hugh, duke of the Franks. She was a daughter of Edward the Elder, king of the Anglo-Saxons and his second wife Ælfflæd.

In 926 Edward's son, king Æthelstan, received an embassy from his cousin, Adelolf, Count of Boulogne, on behalf of Hugh, and Æthelstan agreed to give his half-sister, Eadhild, in marriage in return for an enormous quantity of gifts and relics. According to William of Malmesbury, these included spices, jewels, many swift horses, an elaborate onyx vase, a crown of solid gold, the sword of Constantine the Great, Charlemagne's lance and a piece of the Crown of Thorns. Eadhild's full sister, Eadgifu, was the wife of the deposed king of the West Franks, Charles the Simple. Hugh was a potential rival for the Frankish throne, and Eadgifu may have promoted the marriage in order to sever a dangerous link between Hugh and Count Herbert of Vermandois.

Eadhild died childless in 937.

== Sources ==
- Foot, Sarah (2011). Æthelstan: the first king of England. Yale University Press. ISBN 978-0-300-12535-1.
- Foot, Sarah (2010). "Dynastic Strategies: The West Saxon Royal Family in Europe". In Rollason, David; Leyser, Conrad; Williams, Hannah (eds.). England and the Continent in the Tenth Century:Studies in Honour of Wilhelm Levison (1876-1947). Brepols. ISBN 9782503532080.
- Freeman, Edward Augustus (1867). The History of the Norman Conquest of England. Clarendon Press. p. 234. "eadhild childless."
- Ortenberg, Veronica (2010). "'The King from Overseas: Why did Æthelstan Matter in Tenth-Century Continental Affairs?". In Rollason, David; Leyser, Conrad; Williams, Hannah (eds.). England and the Continent in the Tenth Century:Studies in Honour of Wilhelm Levison (1876-1947). Brepols. ISBN 9782503532080.
