= Beornstan of Winchester =

10th-century Bishop of Winchester

Beornstan
- Bishop of Winchester
- Appointed: May 931
- Term ended: 1 November 934
- Predecessor: Frithestan
- Successor: Ælfheah I

Orders
- Consecration: May 931

Personal details
- Died: 1 November 934
- Denomination: Christian

Sainthood
- Feast day: 4 November
- Venerated in: Catholic Church
- Canonized: Pre-Congregation

Beornstan (or Byrnstan) was an English Bishop of Winchester. He was consecrated in May 931. He died on 1 November 934. After his death, he was revered as a saint.

At the start of the reign of King Æthelstan in 924, Beornstan was a member of his household, one of his mass priests, who were probably responsible for looking after his relics. Early in Æthelstan's reign, Beornstan witnessed his manumission of a slave called Ealdred. Æthelstan followed a policy of appointing members of his own circle to vacant bishoprics in Wessex. Winchester was a centre of opposition to the king under its bishop, Frithestan, and when he resigned in 931 Æthelstan took the chance to appoint Beornstan to the position. He frequently attested the king's charters, though in a lower position than his successor, Ælfheah.

Beornstan died at Old Minster, Winchester, where he was probably buried. He was remembered for his humility, but his cult as a saint was said to have been due to the support of a later bishop of Winchester, Æthelwold, to whom he is supposed to have angrily complained that in heaven he was honoured equally with Birinus and Swithun, but he was neglected in Winchester. His cult never became popular.

== Citations ==
Christian titles
Preceded by Frithestan	Bishop of Winchester; 931–934	Succeeded by Ælfheah I
