= Eadgifu of Wessex =

Queen of the West Franks from 919 to 922

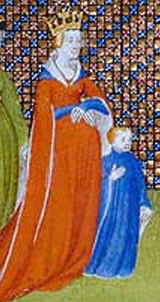
- A 15th-century depiction of Eadgifu of Wessex, with her son Louis IV

Queen consort of the West Franks
- Tenure: 7 October 919 – 922
- Died: in or after 951
- Spouse: Charles III of France; Herbert III of Omois
- Issue: Louis IV of France
- House: Wessex
- Father: Edward the Elder
- Mother: Ælfflæd

Eadgifu or Edgifu (d. in or after 951), also known as Edgiva or Ogive (Old English: Ēadgifu), was Queen of the West Franks as the wife of King Charles the Simple. She was a daughter of Edward the Elder, King of Wessex and England, and his second wife Ælfflæd.

== Queen ==
Eadgifu was one of three West Saxon sisters married to Continental rulers: the others were Eadgyth, who married Otto I, Holy Roman Emperor and Eadhild, who married Hugh the Great. Eadgifu became the second wife of Charles the Simple (more correctly "the Straightforward") King of the West Franks, whom she married between 917 and 919 after the death of his first wife. Eadgifu was mother to King Louis IV of France.

== Flight to England ==
In 923 Charles III was deposed after being defeated at the Battle of Soissons, and he was taken prisoner by Count Herbert II of Vermandois. To protect her son's safety, Eadgifu took Louis to England in 923 and he was brought up at the court of her half-brother, King Æthelstan of England. Because of this, Louis became known as Louis d'Outremer ("from over the sea"). He stayed there until 936, when he was called back to France to be crowned King. Eadgifu accompanied him.

She retired to a convent in Laon. In 951, Herbert the Old, Count of Omois, abducted and married her, to the great anger of her son. She died at Soissons on 26 December in an unknown year and is not recorded after 951.

Eadgifu of Wessex House of Wessex Died: in or after 951
Royal titles
Preceded by Frederuna	Queen of the West Franks; 917/919–923	Succeeded by Beatrice of Vermandois
