= Ælfheah the Bald =

10th-century bishop of Winchester

- Bishop of Winchester
- Appointed: 934 or 935
- Term ended: 12 March 951
- Predecessor: Byrnstan
- Successor: Ælfsige I

Orders
- Consecration: 934 or 935

Personal details
- Born: Ælfheah
- Died: 12 March 951
- Buried: Old Minster in Winchester
- Denomination: Christian

Sainthood
- Feast day: 12 March

Ælfheah the Bald is the commonly used name for Ælfheah (died 12 March 951), the first English Bishop of Winchester of that name. He is sometimes known as Alphege, an older translation of his Old English name.

== Life ==
Ælfheah began his career as a monk and was made Bishop of Winchester in 934 or 935. He was a relative of Dunstan, and took the young man into his service, and later ordained him priest. Ælfheah was an early mover towards the monastic reforms of the next generation and was the tutor of Aethelwold. He died on 12 March 951 and was buried in Old Minster in Winchester. He was subsequently revered as a saint. Following the Norman conquest, Archbishop Lanfranc downgraded a number of Anglo-Saxon saints, including Ælfheah, to bring the liturgical calendar more in line with that of Bec. However, under Anselm's influence, he was subsequently reinstated.

== Citations ==
Christian titles
Preceded by Byrnstan	Bishop of Winchester; 934–951	Succeeded by Ælfsige I
