= England and the Continent in the Tenth Century =

2010 nonfiction book

- Editor: David Rollason; Conrad Leyser; Hannah Williams
- Language: English
- Genre: Non-fiction
- Publication date: 2010

England and the Continent in the Tenth Century: Studies in Honour of Wilhelm Levison (1876–1947) is a 2010 book edited by David Rollason, Conrad Leyser and Hannah Williams.
