= Eadgyth =

Queen of Germany from 936 to 946

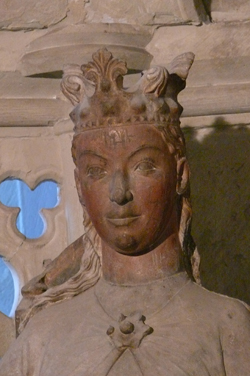
- Detail from a Gothic statue in Magdeburg Cathedral assumed to represent Edith

Queen consort of Germany
- Tenure: 936–946
- Born: c. 910
- Died: 946 (aged 35–36); Magdeburg, Saxony
- Burial: Cathedral of Magdeburg
- Spouse: Otto I of Germany (m. 930)
- Issue: Liutgarde, Duchess of Lorraine; Liudolf, Duke of Swabia
- House: Wessex
- Father: Edward the Elder
- Mother: Ælfflæd

Edith of England, also spelt Eadgyth or Ædgyth (Old English: Ēadgȳð, German: Edgitha; 910–946), a member of the House of Wessex, was the East Frankish (German) queen from 936, by her marriage to King Otto the Great.

== Life ==
Edith was born to the reigning Anglo-Saxon king Edward the Elder by his second wife, Ælfflæd, and hence was a granddaughter of King Alfred the Great. She had an older sister, Eadgifu. She apparently spent her early years near Winchester in Wessex, moving about frequently with the court, and may have spent her later youth, with her mother, living for a time at a monastery.

At the request of the East Frankish king Henry the Fowler, who wished to stake a claim to equality and to seal the alliance between the two Saxon kingdoms, her half-brother King Æthelstan sent his sisters Edith and Edgiva to Germany. Henry's eldest son and heir to the throne Otto was instructed to choose whichever one pleased him best. Otto chose Edith, according to Hrotsvitha a woman "of pure noble countenance, graceful character and truly royal appearance", and married her in 930. In 929 King Otto I had granted the city of Magdeburg to his Edith as dower. She had a particular love for the town and often lived there.

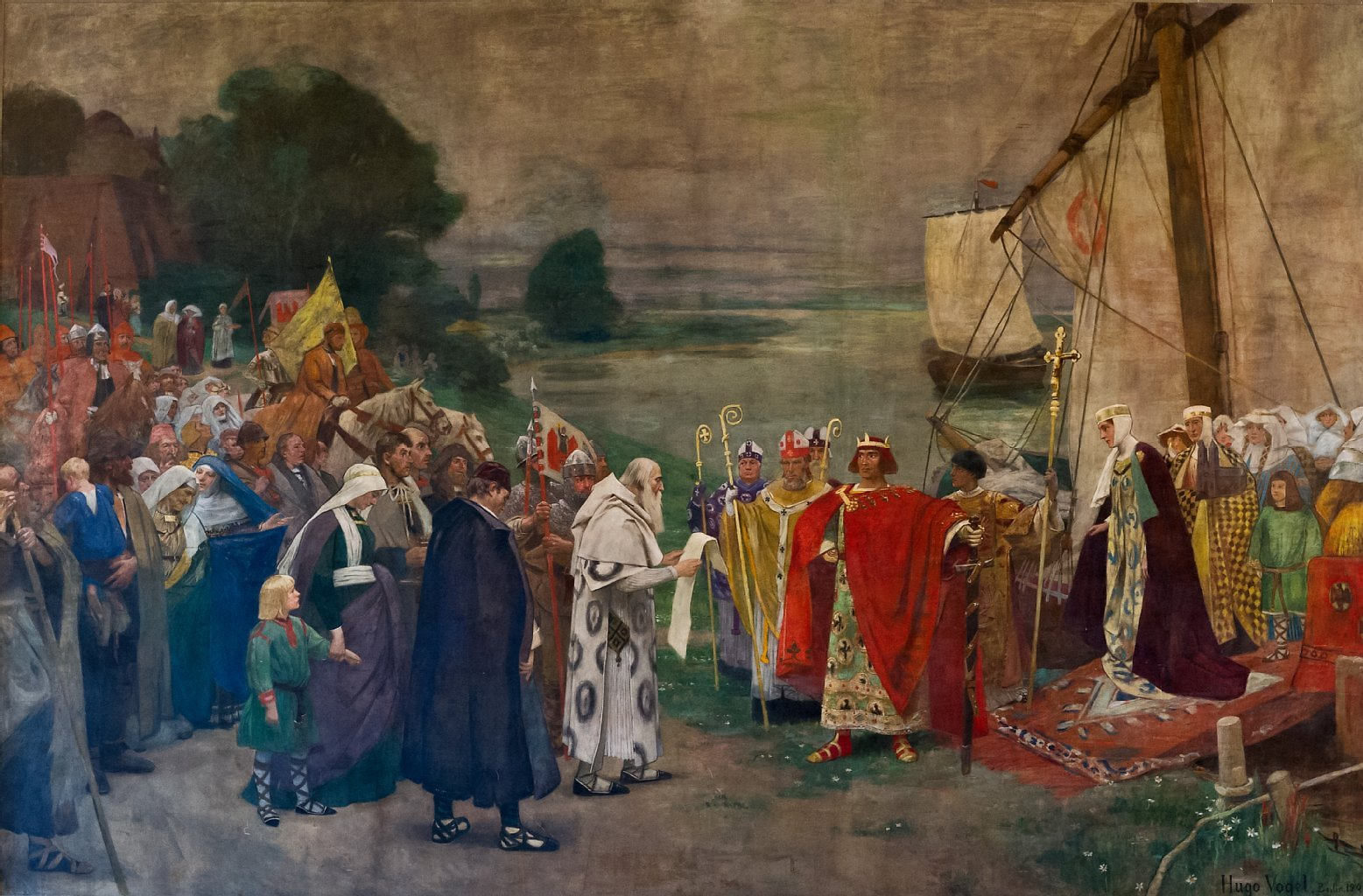
Otto I and his wife Edith arrive near Magdeburg (Hugo Vogel 1898, Ständehaus Merseburg)

In 936 Henry the Fowler died and his eldest son Otto, Edith's husband, was crowned king at Aachen Cathedral. A surviving report of the ceremony by the medieval chronicler Widukind of Corvey makes no mention of his wife having been crowned at this point, but according to Bishop Thietmar of Merseburg's chronicle, Eadgyth was nevertheless anointed as queen, albeit in a separate ceremony.

As queen consort, Edith undertook the usual state duties of a "First Lady": when she turns up in the records it is generally in connection with gifts to the state's favoured monasteries or memorials to holy women and saints. In this respect she seems to have been more diligent than her now widowed and subsequently sainted mother-in-law, Queen Matilda, whose own charitable activities only achieve a single recorded mention from the period of Eadgyth's time as queen. There was probably rivalry between the Benedictine Monastery of St Maurice founded at Magdeburg by Otto and Eadgyth in 937, a year after coming to the throne, and Matilda's foundation Quedlinburg Abbey, intended by her as a memorial to her husband, the late King Henry. Edith accompanied her husband on his travels, though not during battles. While Otto fought against the rebellious dukes Eberhard of Franconia and Gilbert of Lorraine in 939, she spent the hostilities at Lorsch Abbey. In 941 she effected a reconciliation between her husband and his mother.

Like her brother, Æthelstan, Edith was devoted to the cult of their ancestor Saint Oswald of Northumbria and was instrumental in introducing this cult into Germany after her marriage to the emperor. Her lasting influence may have caused certain monasteries and churches in the Duchy of Saxony to be dedicated to this saint.

Eadgyth's death in 946 at around the age of thirty-six, was unexpected. Otto apparently mourned the loss of a beloved spouse. He married Adelaide of Italy in 951.

== Children ==
Edith and Otto's children were:

- Liudolf, Duke of Swabia (930 – 6 September 957)
- Liutgarde (931 – 18 November 953), married the Lotharingian duke Conrad the Red in 947

both buried in St. Alban's Abbey, Mainz (since destroyed).

== Tomb ==
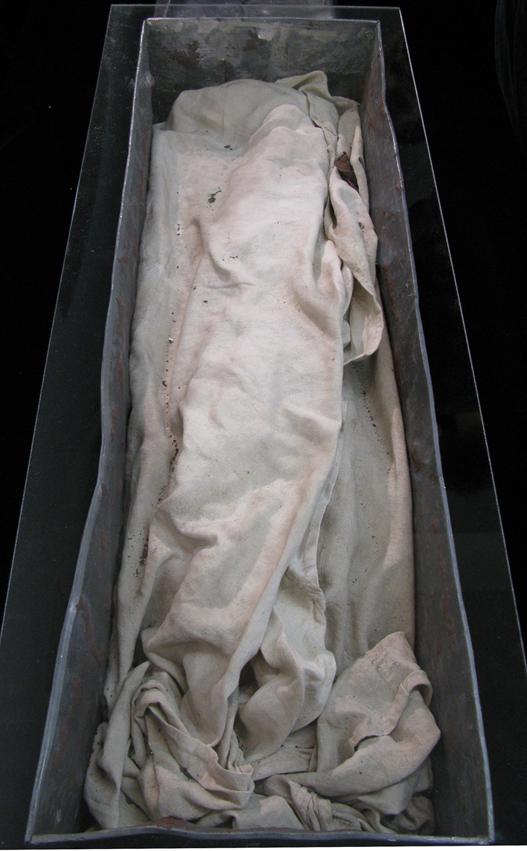
View inside the lead coffin

Initially buried in the St Maurice monastery, Edith's tomb since the 16th century has been located in Magdeburg Cathedral. Long regarded as a cenotaph, a lead coffin inside a stone sarcophagus with her name on it was found and opened in 2008 by archaeologists during work on the building. An inscription recorded that it was the body of Eadgyth, reburied in 1510. The fragmented and incomplete bones were examined in 2009, then brought to Bristol, England, for tests in 2010.

The investigations at Bristol, applying isotope tests on tooth enamel, checked whether she was born and brought up in Wessex and Mercia, as written history indicated. Testing on the bones revealed that they are the remains of Eadgyth, from study made of the enamel of the teeth in her upper jaw. Testing of the enamel revealed that the individual entombed at Magdeburg had spent time as a youth in the chalky uplands of Wessex. The bones are the oldest found of a member of English royalty.

Following the tests the bones were re-interred in a new titanium coffin in her tomb at Magdeburg Cathedral on 22 October 2010.

== Sources ==
- Freytag von Loringhoven, Baron. Stammtafeln zur Geschichte der Europäischen Staaten, 1965.
- Klaniczay, Gábor. Holy Rulers and Blessed Princesses, 2002.

Eadgyth House of Wessex Born: 910 Died: 26 January 946
Royal titles
Preceded by Matilda of Ringelheim	Queen consort of Germany; 2 July 936 – 26 January 946	Succeeded by Adelaide of Italy
