= Ælfweard of Wessex =

King of Wessex in 924 (disputed)

Ælfweard

King of Wessex (disputed)
- Reign: 17 July – c. 2 August 924
- Predecessor: Edward the Elder
- Successor: Æthelstan
- Born: c. 902; Wessex
- Died: c. 2 August 924; Oxford, Wessex
- Burial: New Minster, Winchester
- House: Wessex
- Father: Edward the Elder
- Mother: Ælfflæd

Ælfweard (/ˈælfwɔːrd/; c. 902 – c. 2 August 924) was the second son of Edward the Elder, the eldest born to his second wife Ælfflæd.

== Kingship and death ==
The Anglo-Saxon Chronicle simply states that Ælfweard died soon after his father's death on 17 July 924 and that they were buried together at Winchester. Manuscript D of the Chronicle specifies that he outlived his father by only 16 days. No reign is explicitly attributed to him here. However, a list of West-Saxon kings in the 12th-century Textus Roffensis mentions him as his father's successor, with a reign of four weeks. He is also described as king in the New Minster Liber Vitae, an 11th-century source based in part on earlier material. On the other hand, William of Malmesbury, summarising a text dating to the lifetime of Ælfweard's elder brother Æthelstan, states that Æthelstan succeeded under the terms of his father's will.

This conflicting documentation has led to alternative interpretations, some modern historians concluding that he had succeeded his father in preference to his older half-brother Æthelstan, while others maintain that Æthelstan was the only heir to his father. Alternatively, a divided rule has been suggested, since the so-called Mercian register of the Chronicle reports that Æthelstan became king of the Mercians, and William of Malmesbury, though denying a reign for Ælfweard, reports that Æthelstan was educated at the Mercian court of his aunt Æthelflæd. In the view of Simon Keynes, Ælfweard was recognised as king in Wessex and Æthelstan in Mercia, and although it is possible that Edward intended a division of the kingdom after his death, it is more likely that the leaders of Wessex chose Ælfweard, and Mercia set up Æthelstan in opposition.

Ælfweard died only 16 days after his father, on 2 August 924 at Oxford, and was buried at the New Minster, Winchester. Æthelstan still had difficulty in securing acceptance in Wessex, and he was not crowned King of the Anglo-Saxons until 4 September 925.

== See also ==
- Family tree of English monarchs

== Notes ==
Regnal titles
Preceded by Edward the Elder	— DISPUTED — King of Wessex; 924	Succeeded by Æthelstan
