= Edmund I =

King of the English from 939 to 946

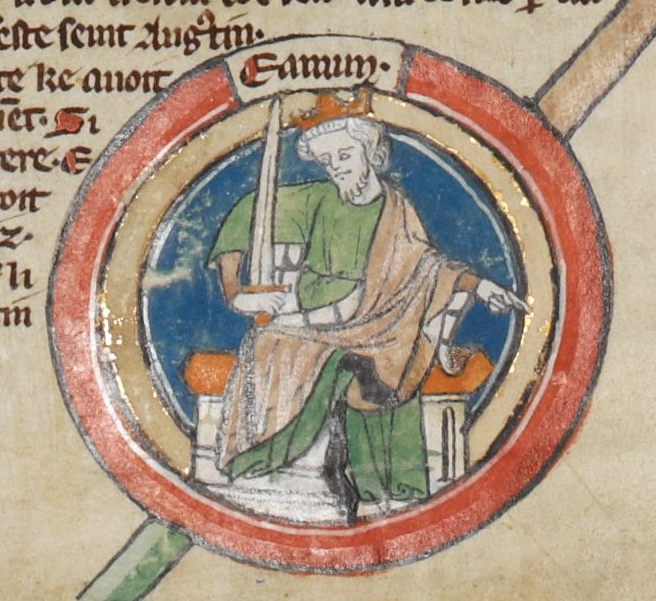
- Edmund in the late thirteenth-century Genealogical Chronicle of the English Kings

King of the English
- Reign: 27 October 939 – 26 May 946
- Coronation: c. 1 December 939
- Predecessor: Æthelstan
- Successor: Eadred
- Born: 920/921
- Died: 26 May 946 (aged 24–26); Pucklechurch, Gloucestershire, England
- Burial: Glastonbury Abbey
- Spouses: Ælfgifu; Æthelflæd
- Issue: Eadwig, King of the English; Edgar, King of the English
- House: Wessex
- Father: Edward the Elder
- Mother: Eadgifu

Edmund I or Eadmund I (Note: He is called Edmund the Elder in Sharon Turner's early nineteenth-century History of the Anglo-Saxons. Other nicknames include Edmund the Deed-Doer, Edmund the Just and Edmund the Magnificent (Latin: Edmundus Magnificus).) (920/921 – 26 May 946) was King of the English from 27 October 939 until his death in 946. He was the elder son of King Edward the Elder and his third wife, Queen Eadgifu, and a grandson of King Alfred the Great. Edmund was crowned king after his eldest half-brother, King Æthelstan, died childless in 939. He had two sons, Eadwig and Edgar, who were young children when he was killed in a brawl with an outlaw at Pucklechurch in Gloucestershire. Edmund was succeeded by his younger brother Eadred, who died in 955 and was followed by Edmund's sons in succession.

Æthelstan had succeeded as the king of England south of the Humber and he became the first king of all England when he conquered Viking-ruled York in 927, but after his death Anlaf Guthfrithson was accepted as King of York and extended Viking rule to the Five Boroughs of north-east Mercia. Edmund was initially forced to accept the reverse, the first major setback for the West Saxon dynasty since Alfred's reign, but he was able to recover his position following Anlaf's death in 941. In 942, Edmund took back control of the Five Boroughs and in 944 he regained control over the whole of England when he expelled the Viking kings of York. Eadred had to deal with further revolts when he became king, and York was not finally conquered until 954. Æthelstan had achieved a dominant position over other British kings and Edmund maintained this, perhaps apart from Scotland. The north Welsh king Idwal Foel may have allied with the Vikings as he was killed by the English in 942. The British kingdom of Strathclyde may also have sided with the Vikings as Edmund ravaged it in 945 and then ceded it to Malcolm I of Scotland. Edmund also continued his brother's friendly relations with Continental rulers, several of whom were married to his half-sisters.

Edmund inherited his brother's interests and leading advisers, such as Oda, whom he appointed Archbishop of Canterbury in 941, Æthelstan Half-King, ealdorman of East Anglia, and Ælfheah the Bald, Bishop of Winchester. Government at the local level was mainly carried on by ealdormen, and Edmund made substantial changes in personnel during his reign, with a move from Æthelstan's main reliance on West Saxons to a greater prominence of men with Mercian connections. Unlike the close relatives of previous kings, his mother Eadgifu and brother Eadred attested many of Edmund's charters, suggesting a high degree of family cooperation. Edmund was also an active legislator, and three of his codes survive. Provisions include ones which attempt to regulate feuds and emphasise the sanctity of the royal person.

The major religious movement of the tenth century, the English Benedictine Reform, reached its peak under Edgar, but Edmund's reign was important in its early stages. He appointed Dunstan abbot of Glastonbury, where he was joined by Æthelwold. They were to be two of the leaders of the reform and they made the abbey the first important centre for disseminating it. Unlike the circle of his son Edgar, Edmund did not take the view that Benedictine monasticism was the only worthwhile religious life, and he also patronised unreformed (non-Benedictine) establishments.

== Background ==
Map of kingdoms and sub-kingdoms in the tenth century

In the ninth century the four Anglo-Saxon kingdoms of Wessex, Mercia, Northumbria and East Anglia came under increasing attack from Vikings, culminating in invasion by the Great Heathen Army in 865. By 878, the Vikings had overrun East Anglia, Northumbria, and Mercia, and nearly conquered Wessex, but in that year the West Saxons fought back under Alfred the Great and achieved a decisive victory at the Battle of Edington. In the 880s and 890s, the Anglo-Saxons ruled Wessex and western Mercia, but the rest of England was under Viking kings. Alfred constructed a network of fortresses, and these helped him to frustrate renewed Viking attacks in the 890s with the assistance of his son-in-law, Æthelred, Lord of the Mercians, and his elder son Edward, who became king when Alfred died in 899. In 909, Edward sent a force of West Saxons and Mercians to attack the Northumbrian Danes, and the following year the Danes retaliated with a raid on Mercia. While they were marching back to Northumbria, they were caught by an Anglo-Saxon army and decisively defeated at the Battle of Tettenhall, ending the threat from the Northumbrian Vikings for a generation. In the 910s, Edward and Æthelflæd, his sister and Æthelred's widow, extended Alfred's network of fortresses and conquered Viking-ruled eastern Mercia and East Anglia. When Edward died in 924, he controlled all England south of the Humber.

Edward was succeeded by his eldest son Æthelstan, who seized control of Northumbria in 927, thus becoming the first king of all England. He then styled himself in charters as king of the English, and soon afterwards Welsh kings and the kings of Scotland and Strathclyde acknowledged his overlordship. After this, he adopted more grandiose titles such as Rex Totius Britanniae (king of the whole of Britain). In 934 he invaded Scotland and in 937 an alliance of armies of Scotland, Strathclyde and the Vikings invaded England. Æthelstan secured a decisive victory at the Battle of Brunanburh, cementing his dominant position in Britain.

Benedictine monasticism had flourished in England in the seventh and eighth centuries, but it severely declined in the late eighth and ninth centuries. By the time Alfred came to the throne in 871, monasteries and knowledge of Latin were at a low ebb, but there was a gradual revival from Alfred's time onwards. This accelerated during Æthelstan's reign, and two leaders of the later tenth-century English Benedictine Reform, Dunstan and Æthelwold, reached maturity in Æthelstan's cosmopolitan, intellectual court of the 930s.

== Family and early life ==
Edmund's father, Edward the Elder, had three wives, eight or nine daughters, several of whom married Continental royalty, and five sons. Æthelstan was the only known son of Edward's first wife, Ecgwynn. His second wife, Ælfflæd, had two sons: Ælfweard, who may have been acknowledged in Wessex as king when his father died in 924 but who died less than a month later, and Edwin, who drowned in 933. In about 919, Edward married Eadgifu, the daughter of Sigehelm, ealdorman of Kent. Edmund, who was born in 920 or 921, (Note: According to William of Malmesbury, Edmund was about eighteen years old when he succeeded to the throne in 939.) was Eadgifu's elder son. Her younger son Eadred succeeded him as king. Edmund had one or two full sisters. Eadburh was a nun at Winchester who was later venerated as a saint. The twelfth-century historian William of Malmesbury gives Edmund a second full sister who married Louis, prince of Aquitaine; she was called Eadgifu, the same name as her mother. William's account is accepted by the historians Ann Williams and Sean Miller, but Æthelstan's biographer Sarah Foot argues that she did not exist, and that William confused her with Ælfgifu, a daughter of Ælfflæd.

Edmund was a young child when his half-brother Æthelstan became king in 924. He grew up at Æthelstan's court, probably with two important Continental exiles, his nephew Louis, future King of the West Franks, and Alain, future Duke of Brittany. According to William of Malmesbury, Æthelstan showed great affection towards Edmund and Eadred: "mere infants at his father's death, he brought them up lovingly in childhood, and when they grew up gave them a share in his kingdom". Edmund may have been a member of the expedition to Scotland in 934 as, according to the Historia de Sancto Cuthberto (History of Saint Cuthbert), Æthelstan instructed that in the event of his death Edmund was to take his body to Cuthbert's shrine at Chester-le-Street. Edmund fought at the Battle of Brunanburh in 937, and in a poem commemorating the victory in the Anglo-Saxon Chronicle (ASC), Edmund ætheling (prince of the royal house) is given such a prominent role – and praised for his heroism alongside Æthelstan – that the historian Simon Walker has suggested that the poem was written during Edmund's reign. At a royal assembly shortly before Æthelstan's death in 939, Edmund and Eadred attested a grant to their full sister, Eadburh, both as regis frater (king's brother). Their attestations may have been because of the family connection, but they also may have been intended to display the throneworthiness of the king's half-brothers when it was known that he did not have long to live. This is the only charter of Æthelstan attested by Edmund, the authenticity of which has not been questioned. (Note: Edmund attested one other charter of Æthelstan which some scholars regard as genuine, S 455, dated to between 934 and 939. (A charter's S number is its number in Peter Sawyer's list of Anglo-Saxon charters, available online at the Electronic Sawyer.)) Æthelstan died childless on 27 October 939 and Edmund's succession to the throne was undisputed. He was the first king to succeed to the throne of all England, and was probably crowned at Kingston-upon-Thames, perhaps on Advent Sunday, 1 December 939.

== Reign ==
=== The loss and recovery of the north ===
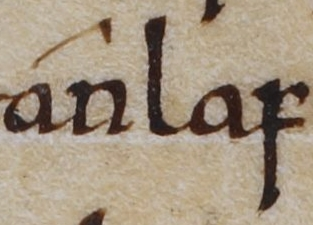
The name "Anlaf" as it is shown in Anglo-Saxon Chronicle C, folio 141v of British Library Cotton MS Tiberius B

Brunanburh saved England from destruction as a united kingdom, and it helped to ensure that Edmund would succeed smoothly to the throne, but it did not preserve him from challenges to his rule once he became king. The chronology of the Viking challenge is disputed, (Note: In 1918 Murray Beaven commented that conflicting dates in the different manuscripts of the Anglo-Saxon Chronicle and the difficulty of distinguishing between Anlaf (or Olaf) Guthfrithson and his cousin Anlaf Sihtricson, who both ruled York in this period, makes Edmund's reign "one of the obscurest in our national annals". ASC D states that the Northumbrians accepted "Anlaf from Ireland" as king in 941 and that he seized Tamworth in 943. Beaven argued that these entries refer to the actions of Anlaf Guthfrithson in 939 and 940 and that after his death in 941, Anlaf Sihtricson was accepted as king of York. Most historians accept Beaven's arguments, and this article follows his chronology, but several historians dispute aspects of it. Alex Woolf suggests that Æthelstan did not resume direct rule of York after Brunanburh, instead appointing Erik Bloodaxe as sub-king, and that he was expelled by Anlaf Guthfrithson in the spring of 940. Clare Downham rejects Woolf's thesis, but defends the ASC D chronology, arguing that it describes events after Anlaf Guthfrithson's death in 941: in her view, Edmund's victory in the Five Boroughs did not recover territory lost to Anlaf Guthfrithson, but rather took full control over land which had for many years been ruled by pagan Vikings. Kevin Halloran takes Downham's thesis further, arguing that Anlaf Guthfrithson was never king of York.) but according to the most widely accepted version, Æthelstan's death encouraged the York Vikings to accept the kingship of Anlaf Guthfrithson, the King of Dublin who had led the Viking forces defeated at Brunanburh. According to ASC D: (Note: Manuscripts of the Anglo-Saxon Chronicle are conventionally labelled ASC A to H.) "Here the Northumbrians belied their pledges and chose Anlaf from Ireland as their king." Anlaf was in York by the end of 939 and the following year he invaded north-east Mercia, aiming to recover the southern territories of the York kingdom which had been conquered by Edward and Æthelflæd. He marched on Northampton, where he was repulsed, and then stormed the ancient Mercian royal centre of Tamworth, with considerable loss of life on both sides. On his way back north he was caught at Leicester by an army under Edmund, but battle was averted by the mediation of Archbishop Wulfstan of York, on behalf of the Vikings, and probably the Archbishop of Canterbury acting for the English. (Note: It is not certain who acted on behalf of the English. The twelfth century Historia Regum says that it was Oda, Archbishop of Canterbury, but the mediation took place in 940 and Oda was not appointed archbishop until 941.) They arranged a treaty at Leicester which surrendered the Five Boroughs of Lincoln, Leicester, Nottingham, Stamford and Derby, to Guthfrithson. This was the first serious setback for the English since Edward the Elder began to roll back Viking conquests in the early tenth century, and it was described by the historian Frank Stenton as "an ignominious surrender". Guthfrithson had coins struck at York with the lower Viking weight than the English standard.

Guthfrithson died in 941, allowing Edmund to reverse his losses. In 942, he recovered the Five Boroughs, and his victory was considered so significant that it was commemorated by a poem in the Anglo-Saxon Chronicle:

Here King Edmund, lord of the English
guardian of kinsmen, beloved instigator of deeds,
conquered Mercia, bounded by The Dore
Whitwell Gap and Humber river
broad ocean-stream; five boroughs:
Leicester and Lincoln,
and Nottingham likewise Stamford also
and Derby. Earlier the Danes were
under Northmen, subjected by force
in heathens' captive fetters,
for a long time until they were ransomed again,
to the honour of Edward's son,
protector of warriors, King Edmund.

Like other tenth century poems in the Anglo-Saxon Chronicle, this one shows a concern with English nationalism and the West Saxon royal dynasty, and in this case displays the Christian English and Danes as united under Edmund in their victorious opposition to Norse (Norwegian) pagans. Stenton commented that the poem brings out the highly significant fact that the Danes of eastern Mercia, after fifteen years of Æthelstan's government, had come to regard themselves as the rightful subjects of the English king. Above all, it emphasises the antagonism between Danes and Norsemen, which is often ignored by modern writers, but underlies the whole history of England in this period. It is the first political poem in the English language, and its author understood political realities.

However, Williams is sceptical, arguing that the poem is not contemporary, and that it is doubtful whether contemporaries saw their situation in those terms. In the same year, Edmund granted large estates in northern Mercia to a leading nobleman, Wulfsige the Black, continuing the policy of his father of granting land in the Danelaw to supporters in order to give them an interest in resisting the Vikings.

Guthfrithson was succeeded as king of York by his cousin, Anlaf Sihtricson, who was baptised in 943 with Edmund as his godfather, suggesting that he accepted West Saxon overlordship. Sihtricson issued his own coinage, but he clearly had rivals in York as coins were also issued there in two other names: Ragnall, a brother of Anlaf Guthfrithson who also accepted baptism under Edmund's sponsorship, and an otherwise unknown Sihtric. The coins of all three men were issued with the same design, which may suggest joint authority. In 944, Edmund expelled the Viking rulers of York and seized control of the city with the assistance of Archbishop Wulfstan, who had previously supported the Vikings, and an ealdorman in Mercia, probably Æthelmund, who had been appointed by Edmund in 940.

When Edmund died, his successor Eadred faced further revolts in Northumbria, which were not finally defeated until 954. In Miller's view, Edmund's reign "shows clearly that although Æthelstan had conquered Northumbria, it was still not really part of a united England, nor would it be until the end of Eadred's reign". The Northumbrians' repeated revolts show that they retained separatist ambitions, which they only abandoned under pressure from successive southern kings. Unlike Æthelstan, Edmund and Eadred rarely claimed jurisdiction over the whole of Britain, although each did sometimes describe himself as 'king of the English' even at times when he did not control Northumbria. In charters, Edmund sometimes even called himself by the lesser title of "king of the Anglo-Saxons" in 940 and 942, and only claimed to be king of all Britain once he had gained full control over Northumbria in 945. (Note: For a list of Edmund's titles in royal charters, see Trousdale's PhD thesis. Edmund also used the title baselios at the beginning of his reign, and it is disputed whether this means emperor or is a synonym for king.) He never described himself as Rex Totius Britanniae on his coinage.

=== Relations with other British kingdoms ===
Edmund inherited overlordship over the kings of Wales from Æthelstan, but Idwal Foel, king of Gwynedd in north Wales, apparently took advantage of Edmund's early weakness to withhold fealty and may have supported Anlaf Guthfrithson, as according to the Annales Cambriæ, he was killed by the English in 942. Between 942 and 950 his kingdom was conquered by Hywel Dda, the king of Deheubarth in south Wales, who is described by the historian of Wales Thomas Charles-Edwards as "the firmest ally of the English "emperors of Britain" among all the kings of his day". Attestations of Welsh kings to English charters appear to have been rare compared with those in Æthelstan's reign, but in the historian David Dumville's view there is no reason to doubt that Edmund retained his overlordship over the Welsh kings. (Note: Welsh kings are only listed as attesting one probable charter (S 1497) of Edmund, dating to late in his reign. However, this is probably because 'mainstream' scribes did not record the attestations of Welsh kings. All charters attested by Welsh and Scottish kings between 928 and 956 were either "Æthelstan A" or "alliterative" charters. For these charters see the 'Charters' section.) In a charter of 944 disposing of land in Devon, Edmund is styled "King of the English and ruler of this British province", suggesting that the former British kingdom of Dumnonia was still not regarded as fully integrated into England, although the historian Simon Keynes "suspects some 'local' interference" in the wording of Edmund's title.

By 945, both Scotland and Strathclyde had kings who had assumed the throne since Brunanburh, and it is likely that whereas Scotland allied with England, Strathclyde held to its alliance with the Vikings. In that year Edmund ravaged Strathclyde. According to the thirteenth century chronicler Roger of Wendover, the invasion was supported by Hywel Dda, and Edmund had two sons of the king of Strathclyde blinded, perhaps to deprive their father of throneworthy heirs. Edmund then gave the kingdom to Malcolm I of Scotland in return for a pledge to defend it on land and on sea, a decision variously interpreted by historians. Dumville and Charles-Edwards regard it as granting Strathclyde to the Scottish king in return for an acknowledgement of Edmund's overlordship, whereas Williams thinks it probably means that he agreed to Malcolm's overlordship of the area in return for an alliance against the Dublin Vikings, and Stenton and Miller see it as recognition by Edmund that Northumbria was the northern limit of Anglo-Saxon England.

According to the hagiography of a Gaelic monk called Cathróe, he travelled through England on his journey from Scotland to the Continent; Edmund summoned him to court and Oda, Archbishop of Canterbury, then ceremonially conducted him to his ship at Lympne. Travelling clerics played an important part in the circulation of manuscripts and ideas in this period, and Cathróe is unlikely to have been the only Celtic cleric at Edmund's court.

=== Relations with Continental Europe ===
Edmund inherited strong Continental contacts from Æthelstan's cosmopolitan court, and these were enhanced by their sisters' marriages to foreign kings and princes. Edmund carried on his brother's Continental policies and maintained his alliances, especially with his nephew King Louis IV of West Francia and Otto I, King of East Francia and future Holy Roman Emperor. Louis was both nephew and brother-in-law of Otto, while Otto and Edmund were brothers-in-law. There were almost certainly extensive diplomatic contacts between Edmund and Continental rulers which have not been recorded, but it is known that Otto sent delegations to Edmund's court. (Note: The statement that Otto sent delegations to Edmund's court is based on stories in the earliest life of Dunstan, written around 1000 by an author who only identified himself as "B". He stated that Edmund threatened to expel Dunstan from the court, upon which Dunstan appealed to members of a visiting embassy from "the eastern kingdom" (regnum orientis) for asylum. In most contemporary Continental sources, 'orientale...regnum' designates Byzantium, but the term is also used to refer to East Francia, which is more likely in this context. "B" also states that an apparition appeared to Dunstan on the day of Edmund's death which claimed to be from "the eastern kingdom".) In the early 940s, some Norman lords sought the help of the Danish prince Harald against Louis, and in 945 Harald captured Louis and handed him to Hugh the Great, Duke of the Franks, who kept him prisoner. Edmund and Otto both protested and demanded his immediate release, but this only took place in exchange for the surrender of the town of Laon to Hugh.

Edmund's name is in the confraternity book of Pfäfers Abbey in Switzerland, perhaps at the request of Archbishop Oda when staying there on his way to or from Rome to collect his pallium. As with the diplomatic delegations, this probably represents rare surviving evidence of extensive contacts between English and Continental churchmen which continued from Æthelstan's reign.

=== Administration ===
Edmund inherited his brother's interests and leading advisers, such as Æthelstan Half-King, ealdorman of East Anglia, Ælfheah the Bald, bishop of Winchester, and Oda, bishop of Ramsbury, who was appointed as Archbishop of Canterbury by Edmund in 941. Æthelstan Half-King first witnessed a charter as an ealdorman in 932, and within three years of Edmund's accession he had been joined by two of his brothers as ealdormen; their territories covered more than half of England and his wife fostered the future King Edgar. The historian Cyril Hart compares the brothers' power during Edmund's reign to that of the Godwins a century later. Edmund's mother, Eadgifu, who had been in eclipse during her step-son's reign, was also very influential.

For the first half of 940, there were no changes in the attestations of ealdormen compared with the end of Æthelstan's reign, but later in the year the number of ealdormen was doubled from four to eight, with three of the new ealdormen covering Mercian districts. (Note: The signatories to charters from 935 to 946 are listed by Alaric Trousdale in his PhD thesis. All signatories to Anglo-Saxon charters are listed in Simon Keynes's An Atlas of Attestations in Anglo-Saxon Charters.) There was an increased reliance on the family of Æthelstan Half-King, which was enriched by grants in 942. The appointments may have been part of Edmund's measures to deal with Anlaf's incursion.

Eadgifu and Eadred attested many of Edmund's charters, showing a high degree of family cooperation; initially Eadgifu attested first, but from sometime in late 943 or early 944 Eadred took precedence, perhaps reflecting his growing authority. Eadgifu attested around one third, always as regis mater (king's mother), including all grants to religious institutions and individuals. Eadred attested over half of his brother's charters. (Note: Eadred almost always attested Edmund's charters as frater regis. Two exceptions are S 505 with cliton (Latin for ætheling) and S 511 with cliton et frater regis.) Eadgifu's and Eadred's prominence in charter attestations is unparalleled by any other West Saxon king's mother and male relative.

=== Charters ===
The period from around 925 to 975 was the golden age of Anglo-Saxon royal charters, when they were at their peak as instruments of royal government, and the scribes who drew up most of Edmund's charters constituted a royal secretariat which he inherited from his brother. From 928 until 935, charters were produced by the very learned scribe designated by scholars as Æthelstan A in a highly elaborate style. Keynes comments: "It is only by dwelling on the glories and complexities of the diplomas drafted and written by Æthelstan A that one can appreciate the elegant simplicity of the diplomas that followed." A scribe known as Edmund C wrote an inscription in a gospel book (BL Cotton Tiberius A. ii folio 15v) during Æthelstan's reign and wrote charters for Edmund and Eadred between 944 and 949.

Most of Edmund's charters belong to the diplomatic "mainstream", including those of Edmund C, but four are part of a group, dating mainly to Eadred's reign, called the 'alliterative charters'. They were drafted by a very learned scholar, almost certainly someone in the circle of Cenwald, Bishop of Worcester, or perhaps the bishop himself. These charters are characterised both by a high proportion of words starting with the same letter and by the use of unusual words. Ben Snook describes the charters as "impressive literary works", and like much of the writing of the period their style displays the influence of Aldhelm, a leading scholar and early eighth century bishop of Sherborne.

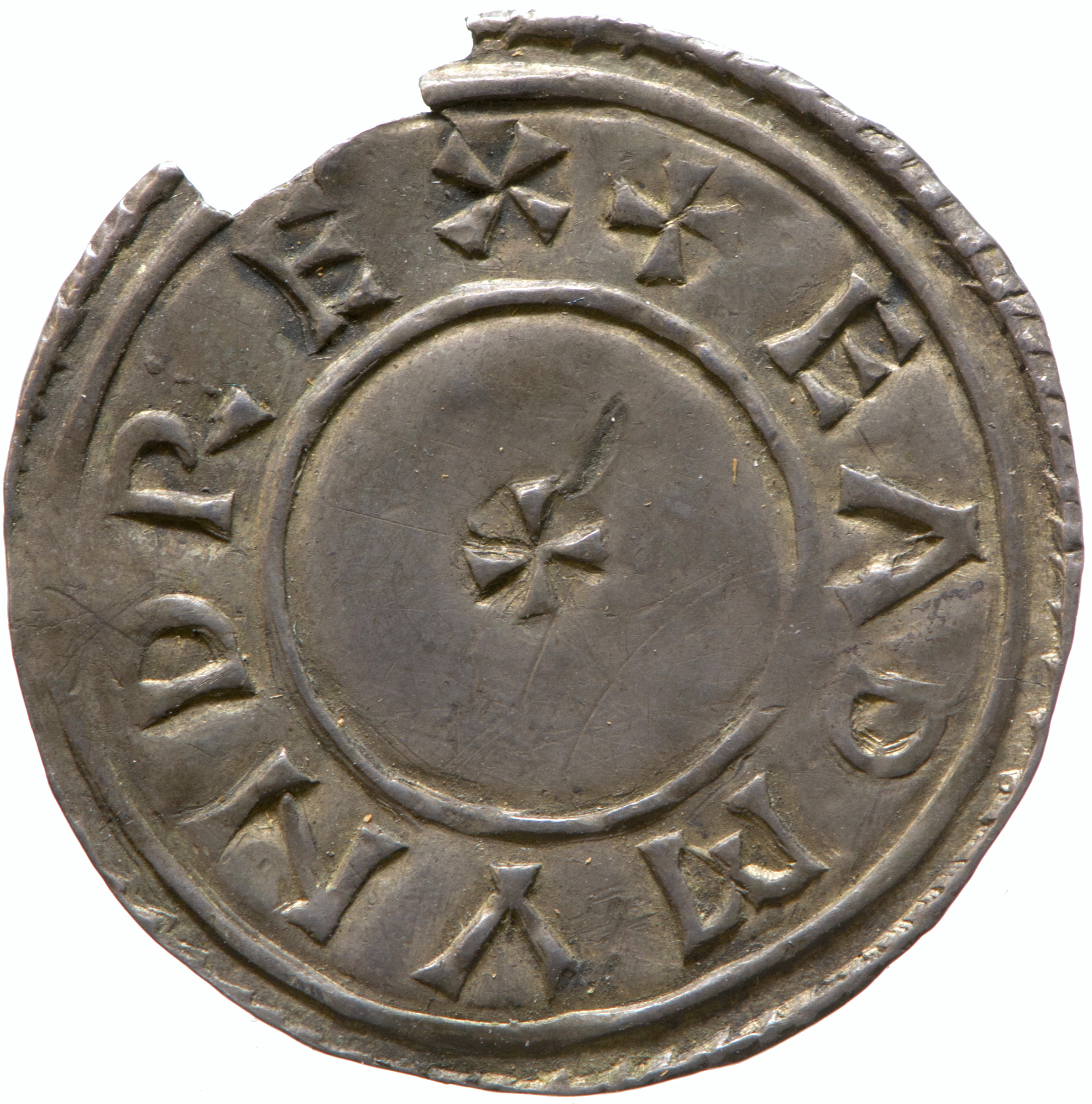
Silver penny, obverse inscribed 'EADMUND REX'

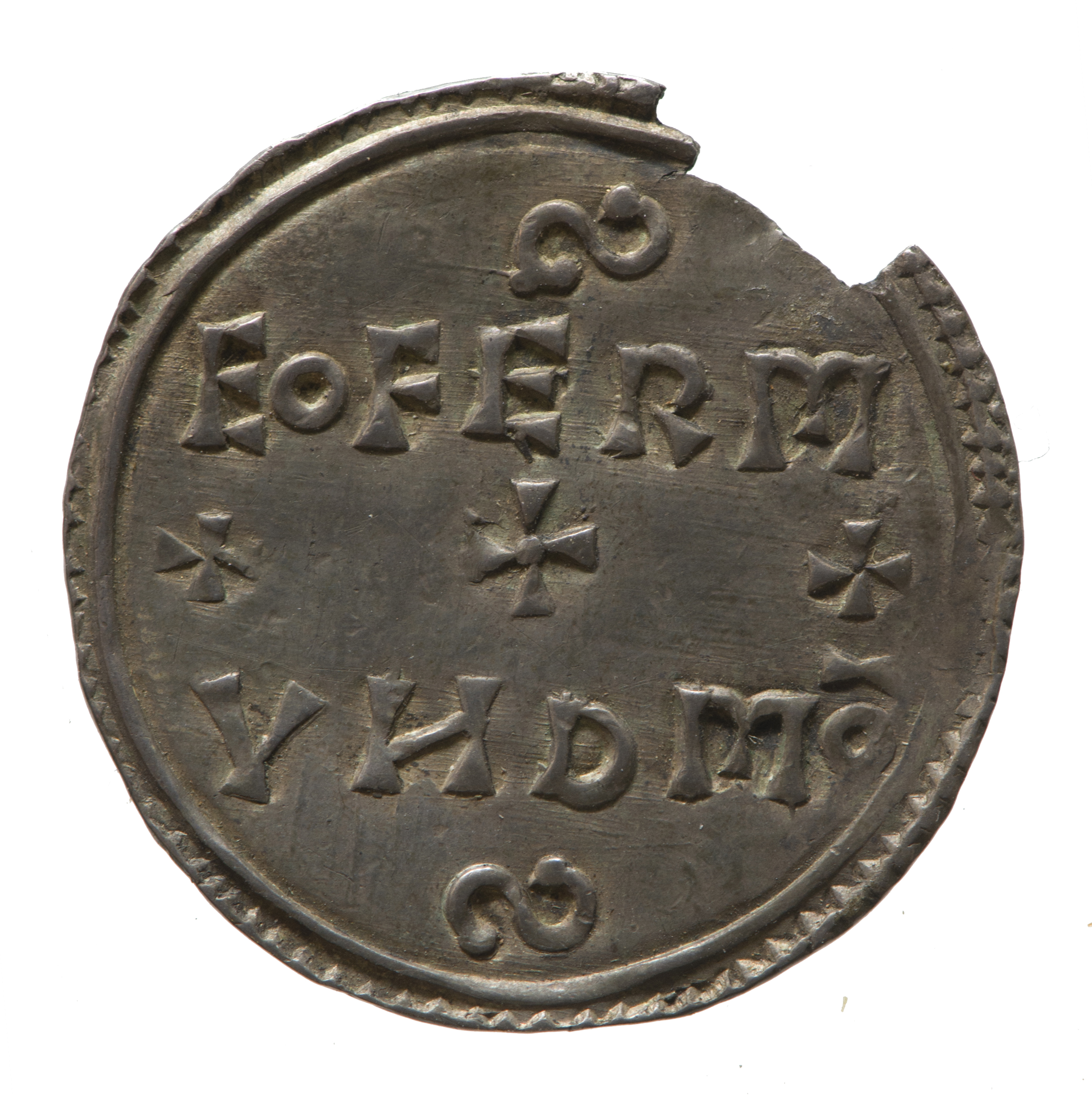
Reverse inscribed 'EOFERMUND M' (Note: This is an HM var (d) (Horizontal reverse with Miscellaneous decoration, variety d) penny struck by the Shrewsbury moneyer Eofermund, York Museum. The "M" stands for Moneta (moneyer).)

=== Coinage ===
The only coin in common use in the tenth century was the penny. (Note: The only other coin was the very rare halfpenny. As of 1989, none were known from Æthelstan's reign and two from Edmund's.) The main coin designs in Edmund's reign were H (Horizontal) types, with a cross or other decoration on the obverse surrounded by a circular inscription including the king's name, and the moneyer's name horizontally on the reverse. There were also substantial numbers of BC (Bust Crowned) types in East Anglia and the Danish shires; these had a portrait of the king, often crudely drawn, on the obverse. For a period in Æthelstan's reign many coins showed the mint town, but this had become rare by the time of Edmund's accession, except in Norwich, where it continued during the 940s for BC types.

After the reign of Edward the Elder there was a slight decline in the weight of coins under Æthelstan, and the deterioration increased after around 940, continuing until Edgar's reform of the coinage in around 973. However, based on a very small sample, there is no evidence of a decline in the silver content under Edmund. His reign saw an increase in regional diversity of the coinage which lasted for twenty years until a return to relative unity of design early in Edgar's reign.

=== Legislation ===
Three law codes of Edmund survive, carrying on Æthelstan's tradition of legal reform. They are called I Edmund, II Edmund and III Edmund. (Note: Edmund's law codes are printed and translated in Agnes Robertson's The Laws of the Kings of England from Edmund to Henry I. II Edmund is also translated by Dorothy Whitelock. They are discussed by Robertson, Patrick Wormald and Alaric Trousdale.) The order in which they were issued is clear, but not the dates of issue. I Edmund is concerned with ecclesiastical matters, while the other codes deal with public order.

I Edmund was promulgated at a council in London convened by Edmund and attended by archbishops Oda and Wulfstan. The code is very similar to "Constitutions" previously promulgated by Oda. Uncelibate clerics were threatened with the loss of property and forbidden burial in consecrated ground, and there were also provisions regarding church dues and the restoration of church property. A clause forbidding a murderer from coming into the neighbourhood of the king, unless he had done penance for his crime, reflected an increasing emphasis on the sanctity of kingship. Edmund was one of the few Anglo-Saxon kings to promulgate laws concerned with sorcery and idolatry, and the code condemns false witness and the use of magical drugs. The association between perjury and the use of drugs in magic was traditional, probably because they both involved the breaking of a religious oath.

In II Edmund, the king and his counsellors are stated to be "greatly distressed by the manifold illegal deeds of violence which are in our midst", and aimed to promote "peace and concord". The main focus is on regulating and controlling blood feuds. The authorities (witan) (Note: Witan (wise men) seems to be used here in a broader sense than its usual one of "councillors".) are required to put a stop to vendettas following murders: the killer should instead pay wergeld (compensation) to the relatives of the victim. If no wergeld is paid, the killer has to bear the feud, but attacks on him are forbidden in churches and royal manor houses. If the killer's kin abandon him and refuse to contribute to a wergeld and to protect him, then it is the king's will that they are to be exempt from the feud: any of the victim's kin taking vengeance on them shall incur the hostility of the king and his friends and shall lose all their possessions. In the view of the historian Dorothy Whitelock the need for legislation to control the feud was partly due to the influx of Danish settlers who believed that it was more manly to pursue a vendetta than to settle a dispute by accepting compensation. Several Scandinavian loan words are first recorded in this code, such as hamsocn, the crime of attacking a homestead; the penalty is loss of all the offender's property, while the king decides whether he also loses his life. Scandinavian loan words are not found in Edmund's other codes, and this one may have been particularly aimed at his Danish subjects. In contrast to Edmund's concern about the level of violence, he congratulated his people on their success in suppressing thefts. The code encourages greater local initiative in upholding the law, while emphasising Edmund's royal dignity and authority.

The relationship between Anglo-Saxon kings and their leading men was personal; kings were lords and protectors in return for pledges of loyalty and obedience, and this is spelled out in terms based on Carolingian legislation for the first time in III Edmund, issued at Colyton in Devon. This requires that "all shall swear in the name of the Lord, before whom that holy thing is holy, that they will be faithful to King Edmund, even as it behooves a man to be faithful to his lord, without any dispute or dissension, openly or in secret, favouring what he favours and discountenancing what he discountenances." The threat of divine retribution was important in a society which had limited coercive power to punish law breaking and disloyalty. The military historian Richard Abels argues that "all" (omnes) shall swear does not mean literally all, but should be understood to mean those men qualified to take oaths administered by royal reeves at shire courts, that is the middling and great landholders, and that Edmund's oath united his diverse peoples by binding them all to him personally. The emphasis on lordship is further seen in provisions setting out the duties of lords to take responsibility for their followers and stand surety for them.

III Edmund was also concerned to prevent theft, especially cattle rustling. The local community is required to cooperate in catching thieves, dead or alive, and to assist in tracking down stolen cattle, while trading had to be witnessed by a high reeve, priest, treasurer or port reeve. According to a provision described by the legal historian Patrick Wormald as gruesome: "we have declared with regard to slaves that, if a number of them commit theft, their leader shall be captured and slain, or hanged, and each of the others shall be scourged three times and have his scalp removed and his little finger mutilated as a token of his guilt". The code has the first reference to the hundred as an administrative unit of local government in a provision requiring anyone who refuses to assist in the apprehension of a thief to pay 120 shillings to the king and 30 shillings to the hundred. (Note: The hundred is mentioned earlier in a code of Æthelstan, but only as a group of men of that number.)

Williams comments "In both the second code and the Colyton legislation, the functions of the four pillars of medieval society, kingship, lordship, family and neighbourhood, are clearly evident." Wormald describes the codes as "an object-lesson in the variety of Anglo-Saxon legal texts", but he sees what they have in common as more important, especially a heightened rhetorical tone which extends to treating murder as an affront to the royal person. The historian Alaric Trousdale sees "explicit funding of local administrative institutions and the greater empowerment of local officials in the application of the law" as original contributions of Edmund's legislation. Edmund is listed in laws of his grandson Æthelred the Unready as one of the wise law-givers of the past.

=== Religion ===
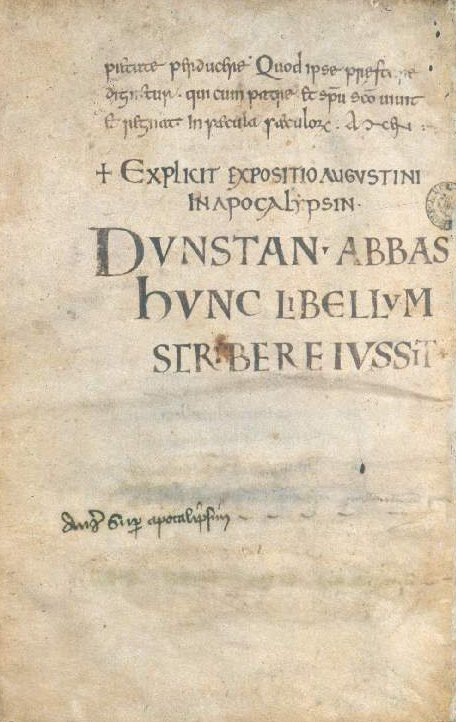
Bodleian Library MS. Hatton 30 folio 73v, c. 940–947, last page of a set of commentaries on the Apocalypse inscribed "Dunstan the abbot gave orders for the writing of this book".

The major religious movement of the tenth century, the English Benedictine Reform, reached its peak under Edgar, but Edmund's reign was important in the early stages, which were led by Oda and Ælfheah, both of whom were monks. Oda had strong connections with Continental centres of reform, especially Fleury Abbey. He had been a leading counsellor of Æthelstan and had helped to negotiate the return of Louis to France as king of the Franks in 936. Dunstan was to be a key figure in the reform and Archbishop of Canterbury, and according to his first biographer he was a leading figure at Edmund's court until his enemies persuaded Edmund to expel him, only for the king to have a change of heart after a narrow escape from death and give him a royal estate at Glastonbury, including its abbey. Williams rejects the story because there is no evidence that he was influential in this period; his brother attested charters, but he did not. Edmund may have given Dunstan the abbey to keep him at a distance because he was too much of a disruptive influence at court. He was joined by Æthelwold, another future reform leader, and they spent much of the next decade studying Benedictine texts at Glastonbury, which became the first centre for disseminating monastic reform.

Edmund visited the shrine of St Cuthbert in Chester-le-Street church, probably on his way to Scotland in 945. He prayed at the shrine and commended himself and his army to the saint. His men gave 60 pounds to the shrine, (Note: In the later Anglo-Saxon period a pound was a unit of account of 240 pence.) and Edmund placed two gold bracelets on the saint's body and wrapped two costly pallia graeca (lengths of Greek cloth) around it. One of the pallia graeca was probably an excellent Byzantine silk found in Cuthbert's tomb known as the "Nature Goddess silk". (Note: The textile historian Clare Higgins dates the silk as late eighth or early ninth century, and argues that Edmund is the most likely donor to Cuthbert's tomb. The silk could have been placed in it by Æthelstan when he visited it in 934, but unlike Edmund he is not known to have revested the body. The tomb was opened again in 1104, and it is also possible that the silk was added then.) He also "granted peace and law better than any it ever had to the whole territory of St Cuthbert". Edmund's show of respect and support for the shrine reflected both the political power of the community of St Cuthbert in the north and southern reverence for him. According to William of Malmesbury, Edmund brought the relics of important Northumbrian saints such as Aidan south to Glastonbury Abbey.

Another sign of the religious revival was the number of aristocratic women who adopted a religious life. Several received grants from Edmund, including a nun called Ælfgyth, who was a patron of Wilton Abbey, and Wynflæd, the mother of Edmund's first wife. Æthelstan had granted two estates to religious women, Edmund made seven such grants and Eadred four. After this the practice ceased abruptly, apart from one further donation. The significance of the donations is uncertain, but the most likely explanation is that in the mid-tenth century some religious aristocratic women were granted the estates so that they could choose how to pursue their vocation, whether by establishing a nunnery or living a religious life in their own homes.

In the reign of Edmund's son Edgar, Æthelwold and his circle insisted that Benedictine monasticism was the only worthwhile form of religious life, but this was not the view of earlier kings such as Edmund. He was concerned to support religion, but was not committed to a particular ideology of religious development. In his grants, he continued Æthelstan's policies. When Gérard of Brogne reformed the Abbey of Saint Bertin by imposing the Benedictine rule in 944, monks who rejected the changes fled to England and Edmund gave them a church owned by the crown at Bath. He may have had personal motives for his assistance, as the monks had given burial to his half-brother, Edwin, who had drowned at sea in 933, but the incident shows that Edmund did not see only one monastic rule as valid. He may also have granted privileges to the unreformed (non-Benedictine) Bury St Edmunds Abbey, but the charter's authenticity is disputed. (Note: For views for and against the authenticity of S 507 see 'Comments' in S 507)

=== Learning ===
Latin learning revived in Æthelstan's reign, influenced by Continental models and by the hermeneutic style of the leading seventh century scholar and Bishop of Sherborne, Aldhelm. The revival continued in Edmund's reign, and Welsh book production became increasingly influential. Welsh manuscripts were studied and copied, and they influenced the early use of Carolingian minuscule script in England, although Continental sources are also important. Edmund's reign also saw the development of a new style of the native square minuscule script, which was used in mid-century royal diplomas. Oda's school at Canterbury was praised by post-Conquest chroniclers, especially for the presence there of Frithegod, a brilliant Continental scholar and the most skilful poet in mid-tenth century England. The "Vatican" recension of the Historia Brittonum was produced in England in Edmund's reign, probably in 944.

== Marriages and children ==
Edmund probably married his first wife Ælfgifu around the time of his accession to the throne, as their second son was born in 943. Their sons Eadwig and Edgar both became kings of England. Ælfgifu's father is not known, but her mother is identified by a charter of Edgar which confirms a grant by his grandmother Wynflæd of land to Shaftesbury Abbey. Ælfgifu was also a benefactor of Shaftesbury Abbey; when she died in 944 she was buried there and venerated as a saint. (Note: In a charter of uncertain authenticity Ælfgifu attests as concubina regis affui (king's present concubine). If genuine, the charter probably dates to the end of her life as Eadred attests above Eadgifu, whereas before late 943 or early 944 Eadgifu attested first.) Edmund had no known children by his second wife, Æthelflæd, who died after 991. Her father Ælfgar became ealdorman of Essex in 946. Edmund presented him with a sword lavishly decorated with gold and silver, which Ælfgar later presented to King Eadred. Æthelflæd's second husband was Æthelstan Rota, a south-east Mercian ealdorman, and her will survives.

== Death and succession ==
On 26 May 946, Edmund was killed in a brawl at Pucklechurch in Gloucestershire. According to the post-Conquest chronicler John of Worcester:

While the glorious Edmund, king of the English, was at the royal township called Pucklechurch in English, in seeking to rescue his steward from Leofa, a most wicked thief, lest he be killed, was himself killed by the same man on the feast of St Augustine, teacher of the English, on Tuesday, 26 May, in the fourth indiction, having completed five years and seven months of his reign. He was borne to Glastonbury, and buried by the abbot, St Dunstan.

The historians Clare Downham and Kevin Halloran dismiss John of Worcester's account and suggest that the king was the victim of a political assassination, but this view has not been accepted by other historians.

Like his son Edgar thirty years later, Edmund was buried at Glastonbury Abbey. The location may have reflected its spiritual prestige and royal endorsement of the monastic reform movement, but as his death was unexpected it is more likely that Dunstan was successful in claiming the body. His sons were still young children, so he was succeeded as king by his brother Eadred, who was in turn succeeded by Edmund's elder son Eadwig in 955.

== Assessment ==
Historians' views of Edmund's character and record differ widely. The historian Barbara Yorke comments that when substantial powers were delegated there was a danger that subjects would become over-powerful: the kings following Æthelstan came to the throne young and had short reigns, and the families of Æthelstan 'Half-King' and Ælfhere, Ealdorman of Mercia, (Note: Ælfhere's career post-dates Edmund's reign, but his father Ealhhelm was a leading ealdorman between 940 and 951.) developed unassailable positions. In the view of Cyril Hart: "For the whole of his brief reign, the young king Edmund remained strongly under the influence of his mother Eadgifu and the "Half King", who between them must have decided much of the national policy." In contrast, Williams describes Edmund as "an energetic and forceful ruler" and Stenton commented that "he proved himself to be both warlike and politically effective", while in Dumville's view, but for his early death "he might yet have been remembered as one of the more remarkable of Anglo-Saxon kings".

The historian Ryan Lavelle comments that "a case can be made, as Alaric Trousdale has recently done [in his PhD thesis on Edmund's reign], for assigning Edmund a central role to the achievements of the tenth century English state". (Note: A version of chapter V of Trousdale's thesis was published in Kingship, Legislation and Power in Anglo-Saxon England, edited by Gale Owen-Crocker and Brian Schneider.) Trousdale comments that the period between the reigns of Æthelstan and Edgar has been comparatively neglected by historians: the reigns of Edmund, Eadred and Eadwig "are often lumped together as a sort of interim period between the much more interesting reigns of Æthelstan and Edgar". He argues that "King Edmund's legislation shows an ambition towards tighter control of the localities through increased cooperation between all levels of government, and that king and archbishop were working closely together in restructuring the English administrative framework". Trousdale sees a transition which "was marked in part by a small yet significant shift away from a reliance on traditional West Saxon administrative structures and the power blocs that had enjoyed influence under King Æthelstan, towards increased cooperation with interests and families from Mercia and East Anglia". He also sees Edmund as moving away from Æthelstan's centralisation of power to a more collegial relationship with local secular and ecclesiastical authorities. Trousdale's picture contrasts with that of other historians such as Sarah Foot, who emphasises the achievements of Æthelstan, and George Molyneaux in his study of the formation of the late Anglo-Saxon state in the reign of Edgar.

== Notes ==
Edmund I House of Wessex Born: c. 920/921 Died: 26 May 946
Regnal titles
| Preceded by Æthelstan | King of the English; 939–946 | Succeeded by Eadred |
