= Æthelflæd of Damerham =

Queen of the English from 944 to 946

Queen consort of the English
- Tenure: c. 944 – 26 May 946
- Spouse: Edmund I of England; Æthelstan
- House: Wessex (by marriage)
- Father: Ælfgar, ealdorman of Essex

Æthelflæd of Damerham was Queen of the English as the second wife of King Edmund I from their marriage c. 944 until Edmund died in 946.

Æthelflæd was a daughter of ealdorman Ælfgar, probably the ealdorman of Essex. Her mother's name is not recorded. She had at least one brother and at least one sister, Ælfflæd (died c. 1002). Ælfflæd was married to Byrhtnoth, who probably succeeded her father as ealdorman of Essex. Byrhtnoth was killed at the Battle of Maldon in 991. Æthelflæd and Ælfflæd were Ælfgar's heirs at his death, some time between 946 and 951 based on the dating of his will, S1483.

Æthelflæd married Edmund following the death in 944 of his first wife Ælfgifu, mother of the future kings Eadwig and Edgar. She and Edmund are not known to have had any children, and Edmund was killed in 946, leaving Æthelflæd as a wealthy widow. Records of Ely Cathedral, to which she, her sister, and her brother-in-law, were generous benefactors, say that she then married ealdorman Æthelstan, probably Æthelstan Rota.

However, the suggestion that she remarried has been disputed.

Æthelflæd's will survives, S1494, and her will, and thus her death, is dated to between 962, and more probably 975, and 991. In addition to gifts to Ely, the will endowed Glastonbury, Canterbury, Bury, and the family monastery of Stoke-by-Nayland.

Royal titles
Preceded by Ælfgifu of Shaftesbury	Queen consort of the English c. 944–946	Succeeded by Ælfgifu, wife of Eadwig
