= John Hughes (antiquary) =

Welsh antiquarian

- Born: 18 May 1776
- Died: 1843 (aged 66–67)
- Occupation: Antiquarian

John Hughes (18 May 1776 – 1843) was a Welsh divine and antiquarian.

== Biography ==
Hughes was the third child of William Hughes, by his second wife, Elizabeth, daughter of John and Gwenllian Thomas of Lanyewan, was born on 18 May 1776 at Brecon, where his father was a respectable tradesman. He was educated at the college grammar school at Brecon. In 1790 he met John Wesley, who was passing northwards from the Bristol conference, joined the Wesleyans, and soon became a local preacher. In 1796, he was ordained a minister, and engaged in mission work on various Welsh circuits until 1805, when he was appointed to superintend the Wesleyan mission in Liverpool, and to pay monthly visits to Manchester. At Manchester he made the acquaintance of Dr. Adam Clarke [q. v.] In 1832, Hughes became a supernumerary, and retired to Knutsford in Cheshire, where he died 15 May 1843. In 1811 he married Esther, eldest daughter of Edward Clarke of Knutsford, who survived him.

Hughes published, besides smaller works:

'A Plea for Religious Liberty,' 1812. ' Horæ Britannicæ, or Studies in Ancient British History,' 2 vols. London, 1818–19, 8vo; a work highly spoken of by Bishop Burgess and Sharon Turner. 'Theological Essays and Discourses on the Nature and Obligations of Public Worship, &c.,'1818. 'An Essay on the Ancient and Present State of the Welsh Language,' London, 1823, 8vo, for which, as for two other essays, he obtained a medal from the Cambrian society. 'Memoir of Miss Pedmore of Knutsford,' 1836. 'Memoir and Remains of the Rev. Mr. Fussel, Wesleyan Minister,' 1840. He left in manuscript (1) a corrected copy of the 'Horæ Britannicæ,' (2) 'A History of Wales,' and (3) 'Historical Triads, Memorials of Remarkable Persons and Occurrences among the Cymry.' The last, which is an annotated translation from the Welsh, is now in the British Museum. A Welsh translation of his friend Dr. Coke's 'Commentary on the New Testament' was begun by him, but was not completed.
