= Ælfgifu of Shaftesbury =

Queen of the English from 939 to 944

Queen consort of the English
- Tenure: c. 939–944
- Died: c. 944
- Burial: Shaftesbury Abbey
- Spouse: Edmund I, King of the English
- Issue: King Eadwig; King Edgar
- Mother: Wynflaed

Saint Ælfgifu of Shaftesbury
- Venerated in: Catholic Church, Eastern Orthodox Church
- Feast: 18 May

Ælfgifu of Shaftesbury, also known as Elgiva, (died 944) was the first wife of King Edmund I (r. 939–946). She was Queen of the English from her marriage in around 939 until her death in 944. Ælfgifu and Edmund were the parents of two future English kings, Eadwig (r. 955–959) and Edgar (r. 959–975). Like her mother Wynflaed, Ælfgifu had a close and special if unknown connection with the royal nunnery of Shaftesbury (Dorset), founded by King Alfred, where she was buried and soon revered as a saint. According to a pre-Conquest tradition from Winchester, her feast day is 18 May.

== Family background ==
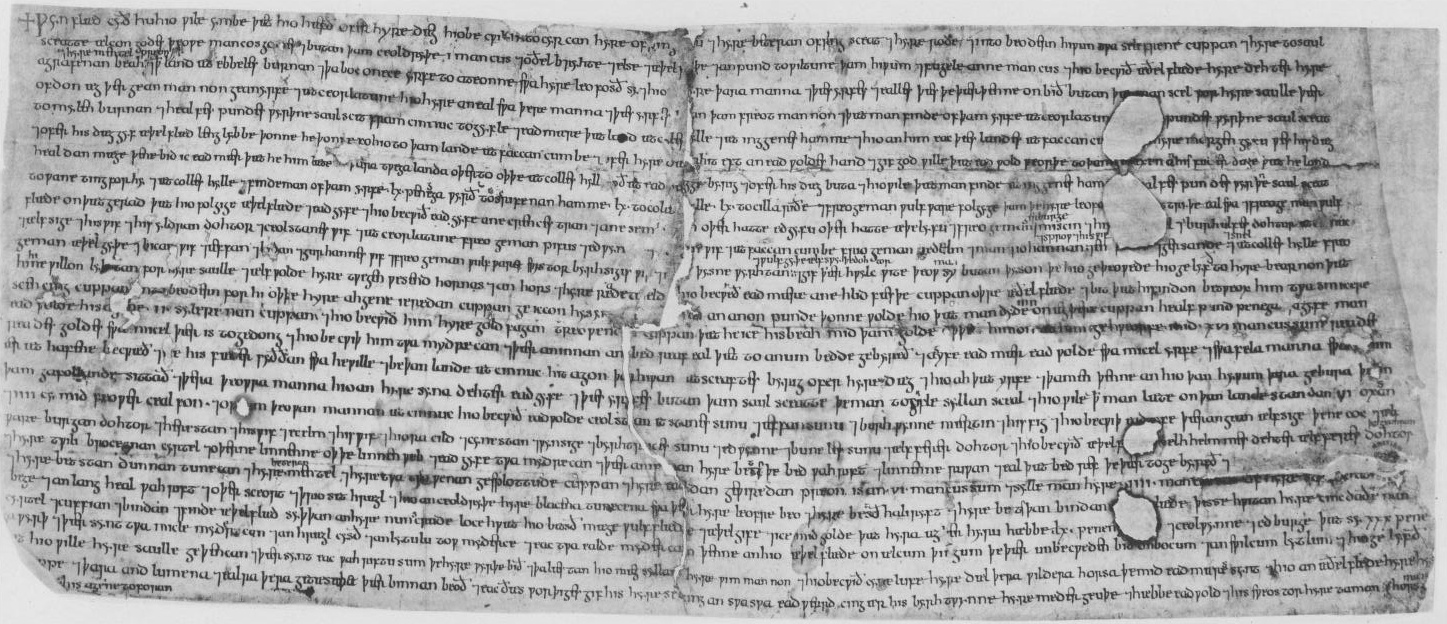
Will of Wynflæd (British Library Cotton Charters viii. 38)

Her mother appears to have been an associate of Shaftesbury Abbey called Wynflaed (also Wynnflæd). The vital clue comes from a charter of King Edgar, in which he confirmed the grant of an estate at Uppidelen (Piddletrenthide, Dorset) made by his grandmother (ava) Wynflæd to Shaftesbury. She may well be the nun or vowess (religiosa femina) of this name in a charter dated 942 and preserved in the abbey's chartulary. It records that she received and retrieved from King Edmund a handful of estates in Dorset, namely Cheselbourne and Winterbourne Tomson, which somehow ended up in the possession of the community.

Since no father or siblings are known, further speculation on Ælfgifu's background has largely depended on the identity of her mother, whose relatively uncommon name has invited further guesswork. H. P. R. Finberg suggests that she was the Wynflæd who drew up a will, supposedly sometime in the mid-10th century, after Ælfgifu's death. This lady held many estates scattered across Wessex (in Somerset, Wiltshire, Berkshire, Oxfordshire, and Hampshire) and was well connected with the nunneries at Wilton and Shaftesbury, both of which were royal foundations. On that basis, a number of relatives have been proposed for Ælfgifu, including a sister called Æthelflæd, a brother called Eadmær, and a grandmother called Brihtwyn.

There is, however, no consensus among scholars about Finberg's suggestion. Simon Keynes and Gale R. Owen object that there is no sign of royal relatives or connections in Wynflæd's will and Finberg's assumptions about Ælfgifu's family therefore stand on shaky ground. Andrew Wareham is less troubled about this and suggests that different kinship strategies may account for it. Much of the issue of identification also seems to hang on the number of years by which Wynflæd can plausibly have outlived her daughter. In this light, it is significant that on palaeographical grounds, David Dumville has rejected the conventional date of c. 950 for the will, which he considers "speculative and too early" (and that one Wynflæd was still alive in 967).

== Married life ==
The sources do not record the date of Ælfgifu's marriage to Edmund. The eldest son Eadwig, who had barely reached majority on his accession in 955, may have been born around 940, which gives us only a very rough terminus ante quem for the betrothal. Although as the mother of two future kings, Ælfgifu proved to be an important royal bed companion, there is no strictly contemporary evidence that she was ever consecrated as queen. In a charter of doubtful authenticity dated 942–946, she attests as the king's concubine (concubina regis). but later in the century Æthelweard the Chronicler styles her queen (regina).

Much of Ælfgifu's claim to fame derives from her association with Shaftesbury. Her patronage of the community is suggested by a charter of King Æthelred, dated 984, according to which the abbey exchanged with King Edmund the large estate at Tisbury (Wiltshire) for Butticanlea (unidentified). Ælfgifu received it from her husband and intended to bequeath it back to the nunnery, but such had not yet come to pass (her son Eadwig demanded that Butticanlea was returned to the royal family first).

== Children ==
Ælfgifu had three children with her husband: two sons and a daughter.

Name	Birth – Death	Notes & Sources
Eadwig, King of England	c. 940 – 1 October 959	King from 23 Nov 955 to 1 Oct 959; died unmarried and childless after annulment of marriage to Ælfgifu.
Edgar, King of England	c. 944 – 8 July 975	King from 1 Oct 959 to 8 Jul 975; married thrice and had five sons and one daughter.
Unknown daughter	Unknown – Unknown	Married Baldwin of Hesdin.

== Death and burial ==
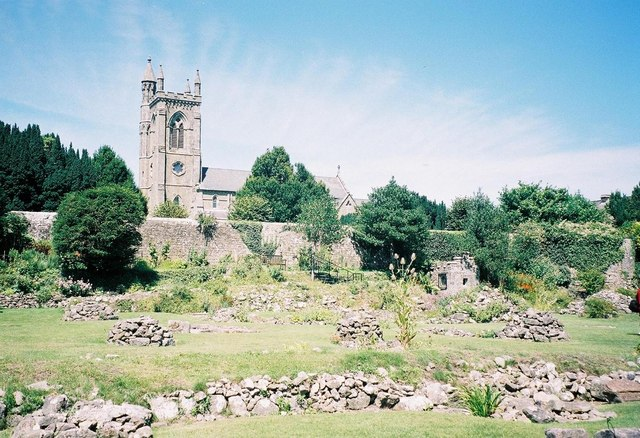
The remains of the Norman buildings which replaced the earlier ones at Shaftesbury Abbey.

Ælfgifu predeceased her husband, probably in 944, and may have died in childbirth of Edgar. In the early 12th century, William of Malmesbury wrote that she suffered from an illness during the last few years of her life, but there may have been some confusion with details of Æthelgifu's life as recorded in a forged foundation charter of the late 11th or 12th century (see below). Her body was buried and enshrined at the nunnery.

== Sainthood ==
Ælfgifu was venerated as a saint soon after her burial at Shaftesbury. Æthelweard reports that many miracles had taken place at her tomb up to his day, and these apparently attracted local attention. The French-born Lantfred of Winchester, who wrote in the 970s, was the earliest known witness of her cult. He relates that a young man from Collingbourne (possibly Collingbourne Kingston, Wiltshire) travelled to Shaftesbury and kept vigil in the hope of being cured of blindness. What led him there was the reputation of "the venerable St Ælfgifu [...] at whose tomb many bodies of sick persons receive medication through the omnipotence of God". Despite the new prominence of Edward the Martyr as a saint interred at Shaftesbury, her cult continued to flourish in later Anglo-Saxon England, as evidenced by her inclusion in a list of saints' resting places, at least 8 pre-Conquest calendars and 3 or 4 litanies from Winchester.

Ælfgifu is styled a saint (Sancte Ælfgife) in the D-text of the Anglo-Saxon Chronicle (mid-11th century) at the point where it specifies Eadwig's and Edgar's royal parentage. Her cult may have been fostered and used to enhance the status of the royal lineage, more narrowly that of her descendants. Lantfred attributes her healing power both to her own merits and those of her son Edgar. It may have been due to her association that in 979 the supposed body of her murdered grandson Edward the Martyr was exhumed and in a spectacular ceremony, received at the nunnery of Shaftesbury, under the supervision of ealdorman Ælfhere.

According to William of Malmesbury, Ælfgifu would secretly redeem those who were publicly condemned to severe judgment, she gave expensive clothes to the poor, and she also had prophetic powers as well as powers of healing.

Ælfgifu's fame at Shaftesbury seems to have eclipsed that of its first abbess, King Alfred's daughter Æthelgifu, so much so perhaps that William of Malmesbury wrote contradictory reports on the abbey's early history. In the Gesta regum, he correctly identifies the first abbess as Alfred's daughter, following Asser, although he gives her the name of Ælfgifu (Elfgiva), while in his Gesta pontificum, he credits Edmund's wife Ælfgifu with the foundation. Either William encountered conflicting information, or he meant to say that Ælfgifu refounded the nunnery. In any event, William would have had access to local traditions at Shaftesbury, since he probably wrote a now lost metrical Life for the community, a fragment of which he included in his Gesta pontificum:

Latin text
Nam nonnullis passa annis morborum molestiam,

defecatam et excoctam Deo dedit animam.
Functas ergo uitae fato beatas exuuias
infinitis clemens signis illustrabat Deitas.
Inops uisus et auditus si adorant tumulum,
sanitati restituti probant sanctae meritum.
Rectum gressum refert domum qui accessit loripes,
mente captus redit sanus, boni sensus locuples

Translation
For some years she suffered from illness,

And gave to God a soul that it had purged and purified
When she died, God brought lustre to her blessed remains
In his clemency with countless miracles.
If a blind man or a deaf worship at her tomb,
They are restored to health and prove the saint's merits.
He who went there lame comes home firm of step,
The madman returns sane, rich in good sense.

== See also ==
- Ælfgifu of Exeter

== Notes ==
Preceded by Eadgifu of Kent as Queen of the Anglo-Saxons	Queen consort of the English; 939–944	Succeeded by Æthelflæd of Damerham
