= Æthelstan Rota =

Anglo-Saxon nobleman

Æthelstan (floruit 940–970) was an Anglo-Saxon nobleman. He served as an Ealdorman in southern Mercia in the reigns of Kings Eadwig and Edgar. He is referred to as Æthelstan Rota (Æthelstan the Red) in one charter, and is so known to distinguish him from Æthelstan Half-King, and another Æthelstan (fl. 940–949), who were Ealdormen in the same period.

Æthelstan rose to prominence in the reign of King Eadwig; Æthelflæd of Damerham, second wife of Eadwig's father King Edmund I, and thus Eadwig's stepmother, was married to this Æthelstan. Æthelflæd was a woman of considerable influence, and not merely as a relict of King Edmund; her father Ælfgar is described as a dux and Ealdorman of Essex.

Æthelstan appears to have had lands in Buckinghamshire and Oxfordshire. He is a frequent witness to charters of Kings Eadwig and Edgar. The Life of Saint Dunstan records a vision by a nobleman named Æthelstan and Dunstan's interpretation of it as presaging the death of the king and ill times to come. It is not known whether this Æthelstan or Æthelstan Half-King is the Æthelstan referred to.
