= Wynflaed =

Anglo-Saxon noblewoman

Wynflæd or Ƿynflæd
- Anglo-Saxon Noblewoman
- Died: c.950 or c.960
- Issue: Ælfgifu of Shaftesbury

Wynflæd or Ƿynflæd (died c. 950 or 960) was an Anglo-Saxon noblewoman and a major landowner in the areas of Hampshire, Somerset, Dorset and Wiltshire. Wynflæd is likely a widow vowess primarily connected to royal foundation at Shaftesbury Abbey, with further connections to royal nunnery at Wilton Abbey. There is ongoing debate if she was the mother of Aelfgifu of Shaftesbury and thus the grandmother of Kings Eadwig and Edgar the Peaceful.

== Wynflæd's Will ==
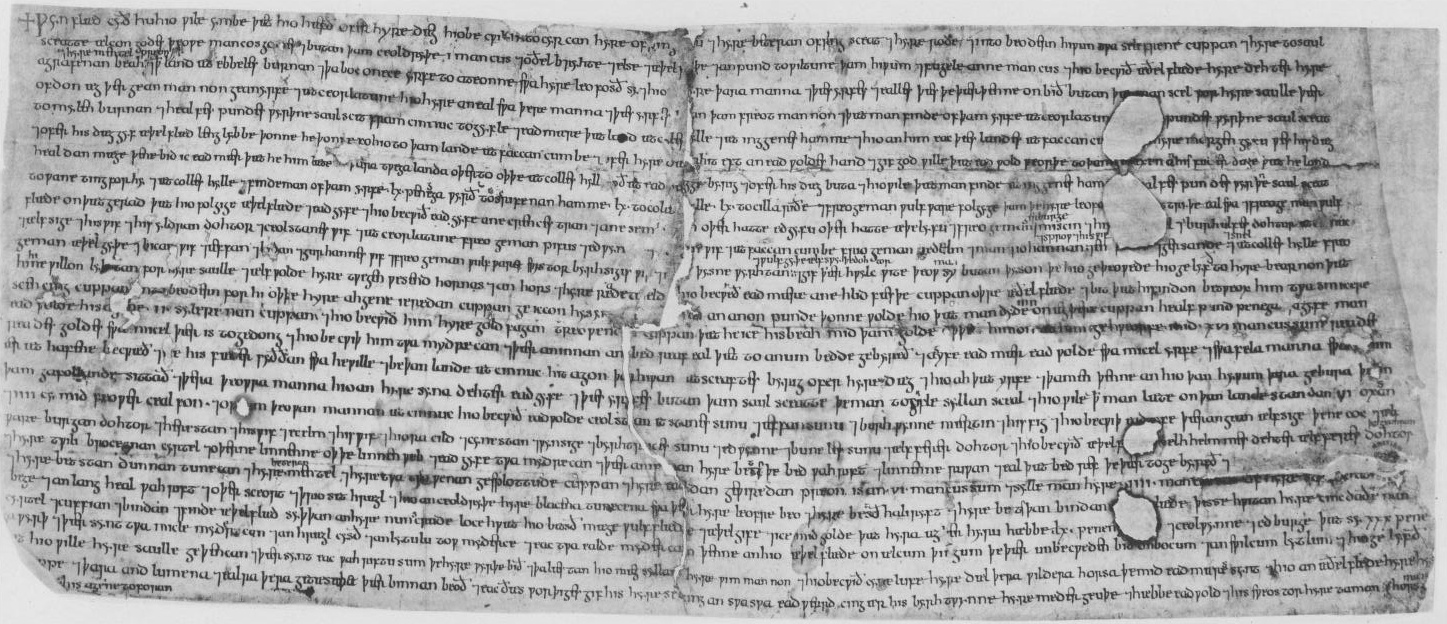
Will of Wynflæd, circa AD 950 (11th-century copy, British Library Cotton Charters viii. 38)

Wynflæd's will has provided scholars with ample materials to better understand tenth-century England and Wessex in particular, including social conditions, material goods, familial strategies, religious women and legal processes. Her will lists holdings and estates including Faccombe Netherton (modern Netherton, Hampshire) and Charlton Horethorne along with further manors and lands, and moveable goods such as tents, chests, cups, and clothing.

In 2018–19, Wynflæd's will was displayed in the British Library exhibition Anglo-Saxon Kingdoms: Art, Word, War and included in the exhibition catalogue edited by Claire Breay and Joanna Story.
