= William Ellis (economist) =

English businessman, writer on economics, and educational thinker

William Ellis (1800–1881) was an English businessman, writer on economics, and educational thinker.

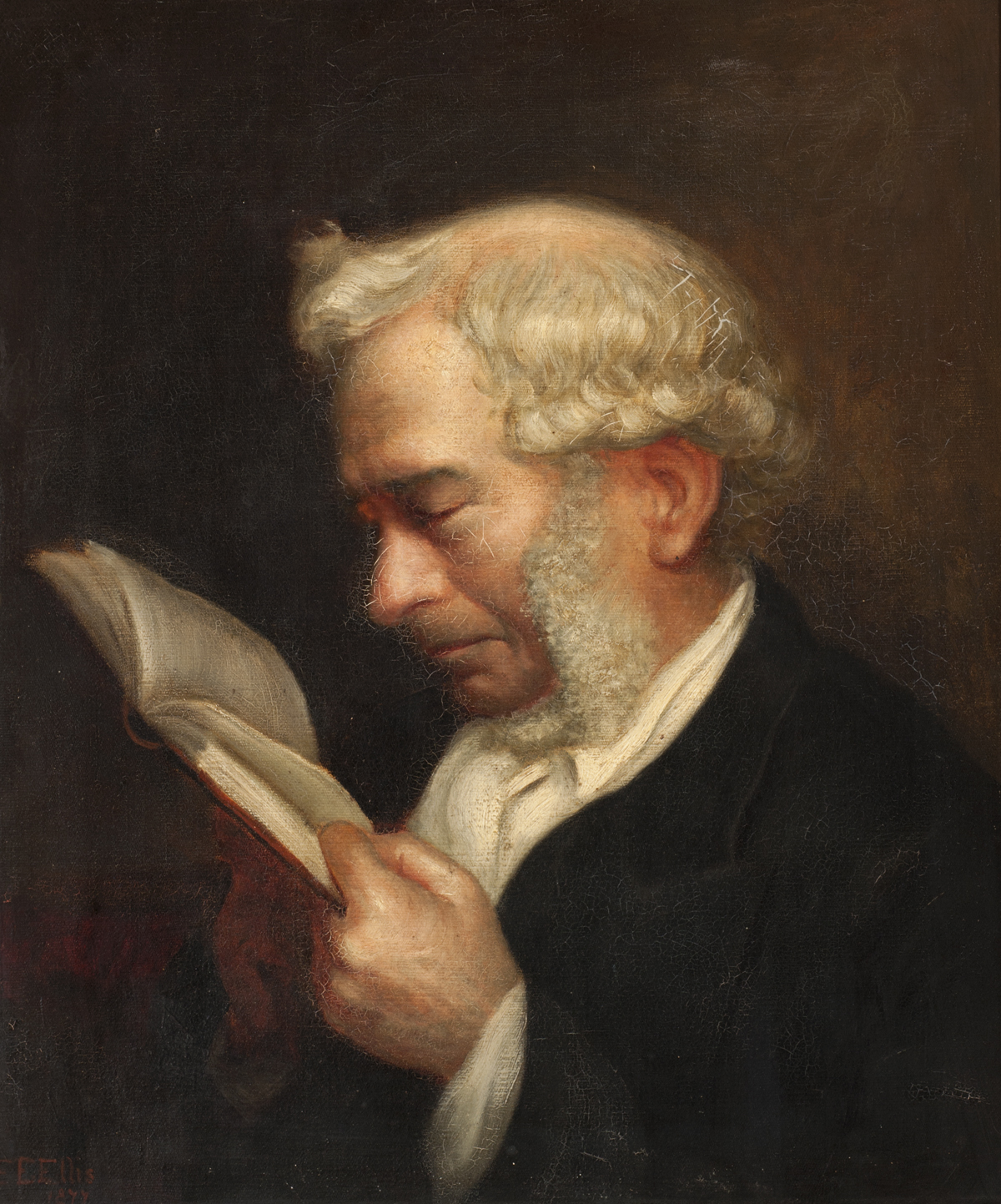
William Ellis, 1877 portrait

== Life ==
Ellis was born in January 1800. His father, Andrew Ellis Ellis, an underwriter at Lloyd's of London, was the descendant of a French refugee family named De Vezian, and took the name Ellis shortly after the son's birth. His mother was Maria Sophia Fazio, of Italian extraction. He was educated at a school in Bromley, and the age of fourteen became his father's assistant at Lloyd's.

In 1824, on the foundation of the Indemnity Marine Insurance Company, he became an assistant-underwriter. In 1827 he was appointed chief manager of the company, and held that position for many years, until on his retirement he was elected director.

== Economic interests ==
Ellis was interested in economic speculations, and joined the "Utilitarian Society" formed by John Stuart Mill. This was a club with at most ten members, and lasted only from the winter of 1822–3 to 1826. His fellow members included William Eyton Tooke, son of the economical writer Thomas Tooke, and John Arthur Roebuck. He joined Mill in another informal club for the discussion of economic questions about 1825–30, and was one of those who "originated new speculations". Ellis was for life a member of the school of economists who were followers of Mill, and became conspicuous for what Mill calls his "apostolic exertions" for educational reform.

== Educational views ==
He believed in the importance of teaching political economy to children. He endeavoured to enforce this theory with great simplicity and earnestness, both in writing and by practice. In 1846 he tried a conversation class on economic subjects in a British school. His success encouraged him to form a class of schoolmasters.

In 1848 he founded the first "Birkbeck School". In 1852 he founded five of these schools at his own expense, naming them after George Birkbeck. At one time there were ten of these schools. He appointed trustees and provided endowments, but only two remained in 1888. The Peckham school had at one time eight hundred pupils. The remaining "Birkbeck school" is Colvestone Primary School (previously 'Kingsland Birkbeck School') in Dalston, East London, still resident in the Grade II listed 1862 building that William Ellis financed. William Ellis School, which moved in 1937 from its initial site in Gospel Oak, is the last of these schools that bears Ellis' name. He later helped to found, and was a governor of, the school of the Middle-class Corporation, to which he contributed munificently until his death. While Ellis largely funded the schools, he had backers in George Combe, William Ballantyne Hodgson and others.

At the request of the Prince Consort he gave lectures to the royal children at Buckingham Palace. Some lectures written by him were read in several towns at the expense of Henry Brougham. He wrote a series of textbooks for the advancement of his economic views; the best known was Lessons on the Phenomena of Industrial Life, edited by Richard Dawes.

== Death and family ==
He died, aged 81, on 18 February 1881 and was buried at West Norwood Cemetery. He married in 1825 Mary, third daughter of the historian Sharon Turner. She died in 1870, and he survived his two sons.

== Works ==
His works include:

- Outlines of Social Economy, 1846.
- Education as a means of Preventing Destitution, 1851.
- A Layman's Contribution to the Knowledge and Practice of Religion in Common Life, 1857 (an exposition of economic principles).
- Where must we look for the further Prevention of Crime? 1857.
- Philo-Socrates (a series of papers), 1861.
- Introduction to the Study of the Social Sciences, 1863; a lecture at University College.
- Thoughts on the Future of the Human Race, 1866.
- What stops the Way? or the two great difficulties, 1868.

Ellis also contributed the article on "Marine Insurance" to the first edition of John Ramsay McCulloch's Commercial Dictionary. Some of his books were translated and two of them were introduced into the primary schools in France.
