= The History of the Anglo-Saxons =

Publication by Sharon Turner

The History of the Anglo-Saxons is a three volume publication by English historian Sharon Turner written between 1799 and 1805. It covers the history of England up to the Norman conquest. Under the influence of Thomas Percy's Reliques of Ancient English Poetry he compiled the first edition of the History of the Anglo-Saxons between 1799 and 1805, and became one of the earliest scholars to document Anglo-Saxon historical manuscripts in the Cottonian collection at the British Museum. By 1852, the history had seen seven editions. "Immensely popular", Turner's History "had immediate and lasting effects, stimulating both Anglo-Saxon studies as an academic discipline and the ideology of England as an ancient Anglo-Saxon nation". It was cited as an influence by Walter Scott in his preface to Ivanhoe and was a key step in inspiring John Mitchell Kemble's landmark 1837 edition of Beowulf.

Although Turner "specifically defended the idea of a single human species", his work also became important in emerging nineteenth-century theories of racial supremacism.

Written and revised as Britain sailed toward the national-imperial horizons of its Victorian Age, Turner’s History envisions the Anglo-Saxon past as a romantic narrative that anticipates an English future. Consequently ... the historical integrity of Turner’s labors in the British Museum is compromised by his Whiggish commitments, nationalist fervor, orientalist sentiments and imperialist beliefs. Likewise, the racist and colonialist uses to which later editions of his History were put in the post-bellum South and in settlement-period Australia have further jaundiced its academic legitimacy outside of England.

The master copy is currently under the personal ownership of Professor Lewis Nicholson.

== Digitised texts ==
- 3rd edn, vol 1 (1820) – via Google Books.
- 4th edn, vol 2 (1823) – via Google Books.
- 4th edn, vol 3 (1823) – via Google Books.
