= Eadwig =

King of England from 955 to 959

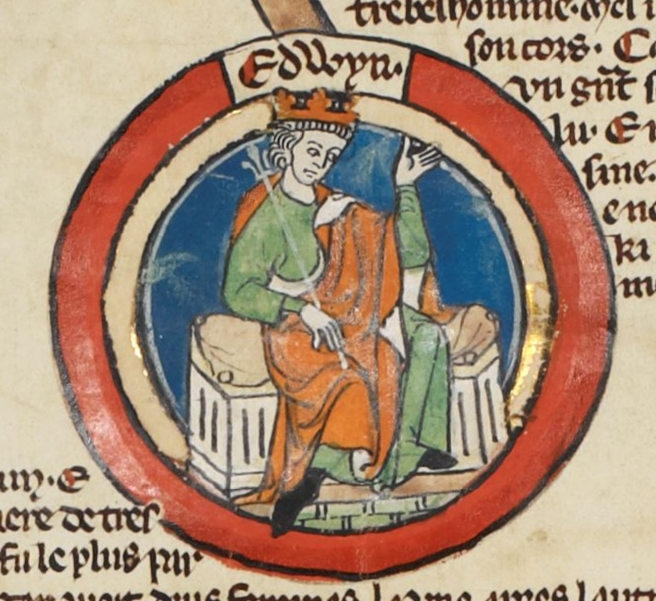
- Eadwig in the early fourteenth-century Genealogical Roll of the Kings of England

King of the English
- Reign: 23 November 955 – 1 October 959
- Predecessor: Eadred
- Successor: Edgar
- Born: 940/941
- Died: 1 October 959 (aged c. 19)
- Burial: New Minster, Winchester
- Spouse: Ælfgifu (annulled)
- House: Wessex
- Father: Edmund I
- Mother: Ælfgifu

Eadwig (also Edwy or Eadwig All-Fair, c. 940 – 1 October 959) was King of England from 23 November 955 until his death in 959. He was the elder son of Edmund I and his first wife Ælfgifu, who died in 944. Eadwig and his brother Edgar were young children when their father was killed trying to rescue his seneschal from attack by an outlawed thief on 26 May 946. As Edmund's sons were too young to rule he was succeeded by his brother Eadred, who suffered from ill health and died unmarried in his early 30s.

Eadwig became king in 955 aged about fifteen and was no more than twenty when he died in 959. He clashed at the beginning of his reign with Dunstan, the powerful Abbot of Glastonbury and future Archbishop of Canterbury, and exiled him to Flanders. He later came to be seen as an enemy of monasteries, but most historians think that this reputation is unfair. In 956, he issued more than sixty charters transferring land, a yearly total unmatched by any other European king before the twelfth century, and this is seen by some historians as either an attempt to buy support or rewarding his favourites at the expense of the powerful old guard of the previous reign.

In 957, the kingdom was divided between Eadwig, who kept the territory south of the Thames, and Edgar, who became king of the land north of it. Historians disagree whether this had been planned since the beginning of his reign or was the result of a successful revolt brought about by Eadwig's enemies. The following year, Oda, Archbishop of Canterbury, separated Eadwig from his wife Ælfgifu on the ground that they were too closely related. Edgar succeeded to the whole kingdom when Eadwig died in 959.

The Benedictine reform movement became dominant in Edgar's reign with his strong support, and monastic writers praised him and condemned Eadwig as irresponsible and incompetent. Their view was generally accepted by historians until the late twentieth century, but in the twenty-first century some historians have defended Eadwig, while others see his character and the events of his reign as unclear due to uncertain and conflicting evidence.

== Background ==
In the ninth century Anglo-Saxon England came under increasing attack from Viking raids, culminating in invasion by the Viking Great Heathen Army in 865. By 878, the army had overrun the kingdoms of Northumbria, East Anglia, and Mercia, and nearly conquered Wessex, but in that year the West Saxons achieved a decisive victory at the Battle of Edington under King Alfred the Great. By 883, Æthelred, Lord of the Mercians, had accepted Alfred's overlordship, and in the 880s and 890s the Anglo-Saxons ruled Wessex and western Mercia, but the rest of England was under Viking rule. Alfred died in 899 and was succeeded by his son, Edward the Elder. In the 910s, Edward and Æthelflæd, Lady of the Mercians, who was his sister and Æthelred's widow, conquered Viking-ruled eastern Mercia and East Anglia. Æthelflæd died in 918 and the Mercians installed her daughter Ælfwynn as the second Lady of the Mercians, but Edward seized her and established full control over Mercia. When he died in 924, he controlled all of England south of the Humber.

Edward was succeeded by his eldest son Æthelstan, who may have been king only of Mercia at first, but ruled the whole of his father's realm by the next year. In 927, he conquered Northumbria and thus became the first king of all of England. He died in October 939 and was succeeded by his half-brother and Eadwig's father, Edmund, who was the first king to succeed to the throne of all England. He almost immediately lost control of the north when Anlaf Guthfrithson, the Viking king of Dublin, crossed the sea to become king of York (southern Northumbria). He then invaded Mercia and Edmund was forced to surrender north-east Mercia to him, but Guthfrithson died in 941. By 944, York was ruled by two Viking kings, Anlaf Sihtricson and Ragnall Guthfrithson, and in that year Edmund expelled them and recovered full control of England. On 26 May 946, he was stabbed to death trying to protect his seneschal from attack by a convicted outlaw at Pucklechurch in Gloucestershire, and as his sons Eadwig and Edgar were young children, their uncle Eadred became king.

Like Edmund, Eadred inherited the kingship of the whole of England but soon lost it when York accepted a Viking leader as king. The sequence of events is unclear, but Eadred, Anlaf Sihtricson and Erik Bloodaxe ruled the kingdom of York at different periods until its magnates expelled Erik, and Northumbria became permanently part of England. Eadred then appointed Osulf, the Anglo-Saxon ruler of Bamburgh (northern Northumbria), as the earl of all Northumbria. Eadred died on 23 November 955, and Eadwig succeeded at the age of around fifteen. He was the first king since the early ninth century not to face the threat of imminent foreign invasion, although this could not have been known at the time. In his will Eadred left 1600 pounds (Note: In this period a pound was not a coin but a unit of account equivalent to 240 pence.) to be used for protection of his people from famine or to buy peace from a heathen army, showing that he did not regard England as safe from attack.

== Family and early life ==
Eadwig was born around 940. He was the elder son of Edmund and his first wife Ælfgifu, who died in 944. She and her mother Wynflæd were benefactors to Shaftesbury Abbey, where Ælfgifu was buried and venerated as a saint. Ælfhere, the ealdorman of Mercia, was acknowledged as a relative of the royal family, and his sister married the magnate Ælfric Cild, who is described in a charter of 956 as Eadwig's adoptivus parens. This term is generally taken by historians to refer to Ælfric's status as a relative of Eadwig by marriage, but he may have played a role in bringing up Eadwig. Eadwig and Edgar are not recorded in contemporary sources until 955, when they first attested charters, suggesting that they did not regularly attend court when they were young. King Eadred never married, and his attitude towards the claims of his nephews is uncertain. Eadwig attested Eadred's charters as ætheling or cliton (Old English and Latin respectively for prince), and while some give Edgar the same title, others show him as Eadwig's brother.

== Reign ==
The evidence for Eadwig's reign is ambiguous and unclear, and historians differ widely both on his character and on the politics of his reign. The principal controversies concern his marriage and its dissolution in 958, and the division of the kingdom in 957 between Eadwig, who kept England south of the Thames, and Edgar, who became king of the land north of it.

=== Eadwig's marriage ===
Eadwig was crowned at Kingston upon Thames, probably in late January 956. After the ceremony, a feast was held for the king and his leading magnates, including Oda, Archbishop of Canterbury, and Dunstan, the Abbot of Glastonbury and a future Archbishop of Canterbury. According to Dunstan's earliest hagiographer, who identified himself only as "B", a well born woman and her adult daughter, who hoped to secure a marriage with Eadwig to one of them, were pursuing Eadwig with "indecent proposals", and he offended the assembled nobles by leaving the feast to "caress these whores". Oda urged that he should be brought back to the feast, but almost all the nobles feared to offend the king, and only Dunstan and his relative Cynesige, Bishop of Lichfield, had the courage to face his ire. B went on:

As the nobles had requested, they went in and found the royal crown, brilliant with the wonderful gold and silver and variously sparkling jewels that made it up, tossed carelessly on the ground some distance from the king's head, while he was disporting himself disgracefully between the two women as though they were wallowing in some revolting pigsty. They said to the king: "Our nobles have sent us to ask you to come with all speed to take your proper place in the hall, and not to refuse to show yourself at this happy occasion with your great men." Dunstan first told off the foolish women. As for the king, since he would not get up, Dunstan put out his hand and removed him from the couch where he had been fornicating with the harlots, put his diadem on him, and marched him off to the royal company, parted from his women if only by main force.

"B" names one of the women as Æthelgifu, the mother of Eadwig's future wife, Ælfgifu, but he does not name the daughter in his account. "B" aimed both to show Dunstan in a favourable light and to present Eadwig as acting unregally at the coronation feast, thus demonstrating his unfitness to be king. Dunstan was exiled from England, and "B" said that he was driven out as a result of the machinations of Æthelgifu, and that Dunstan's own pupils sided against him. Dunstan's opponents probably included Æthelwold, Abbot of Abingdon and future Bishop of Winchester. Æthelwold supported the marriage, describing Ælfgifu in an Abingdon charter as "the king's wife", and she left him an estate in her will.

"B"'s version is accepted by Michael Wood, who describes Eadwig as "deeply unpleasant", but most historians are sceptical. Ælfgifu was a member of the highest West Saxon aristocracy and she appears to have been on good terms with Edgar after his accession. He described her as his relative in charters granting her property. The historian Rory Naismith sees the story of Dunstan's intervention at the coronation dinner as "essentially a piece of propaganda designed to blacken the reputation of Eadwig, Ælfgifu and her mother". Frank Stenton comments on the story:

Even in its earliest form it has already assumed a scandalous colour which clashes with better evidence. It is known, for example, that the younger of the two ladies married the king and that she was honoured in one of the greatest of English monasteries. In the Liber Vitae of New Minster, Ælfgifu, wife of King Eadwig, appears in a list of "illustrious women, choosing this holy place for the love of God, who have commended themselves to the prayers of the community by the gift of alms". Churchmen of the highest merit were willing to come to court when both the ladies were present. All that can be safely inferred from the story is the high probability that Dunstan was exiled because he had affronted the king, the woman who became the king's wife, and her mother.

The marriage was politically important as part of Eadwig's efforts to strengthen his position as king, and it may have been seen as a threat by the circle around Edgar as it could have cut him out from the prospect of inheriting the crown. According to version "D" of the Anglo-Saxon Chronicle (ASC D), in 958 "Archbishop Oda separated King Eadwig and Ælfgifu, because they were too closely related". It is not certain what their relationship was, but Eadwig's wife has been identified as the Ælfgifu who made a will naming Æthelweard as her brother, and he has been identified as the chronicler Æthelweard, who was descended from King Æthelred I, which would have made her Eadwig's third cousin once removed. (Note: Roman civil law forbade marriages within four degrees, counting up from a prospective spouse to the common ancestor and back down the other prospective spouse, which made marriages between first cousins incestuous, and this rule was adopted by the early church. In the ninth century, the church adopted a much stricter rule, forbidding marriages between people related in seven degrees and counting only once back to the common ancestor, which made marriages between people with a common great-great-great-great-grandparent ineligible. Churchmen denounced marriages within forbidden degrees as incestuous, and in the tenth and eleventh centuries Continental nobility increasingly tried to avoid such unions. This created severe problems, especially for royalty, as almost all prospective partners of suitable status were too closely related, and in 988 Hugh Capet, King of the Franks, unsuccessfully sought a daughter of the Byzantine emperor as a wife for his son Robert. After Hugh died, Robert married Bertha of Burgundy, who was his second cousin, and thus related in the third degree, shocking contemporaries. Pope Gregory V condemned the marriage as incestuous and a Roman synod demanded that Hugh leave Bertha and sentenced the couple to seven years' penance, but Robert ignored the complaints until it became clear that Bertha was not going to give him a son, and the charge of incest then provided a convenient excuse for ending the marriage. Consanguinity which was ignored at the time of a marriage provided a convenient justification for ending it in other cases, such as that of King Louis VII of France and Eleanor of Aquitaine in 1152. The law code of 1008 known as VI Æthelred declares that "it must never happen that a Christian man marries among his own kin within six degrees of relationship, that is, within the fourth generation". If Ælfgifu was the sister of the chronicler Æthelweard, who stated that Alfred the Great's elder brother King Æthelred I was his great-great-grandfather, she and Eadwig were related in the fourth degree on his side and the fifth on hers by their common descent from King Æthelwulf and his wife Osburh.)

Simon Keynes also questions "B"'s account of the coronation feast, suggesting that Oda may have objected to the marriage on the ground that it was against ecclesiastical law and that "B"'s version may have been based on an unsuccessful attempt by Dunstan and Cynesige to dissuade him from the marriage. In the view of Michael Winterbottom and Michael Lapidge "B's account [of the feast] is a lurid fabrication of Oda's implementation of the procedures of canon law". On the other hand, Sean Miller argues that objections to the marriage were political rather than religious, and Pauline Stafford sees the annulment as a result of the successful revolt of Edgar, which weakened Eadwig so much that his enemies felt able to act against him.

Byrhtferth, in his hagiographical Life of St Oswald, states that Eadwig, who was "leading a wicked life – as immoderate youth is accustomed to do – loved another woman as if she were his own wife"; he eloped with her, and Oda (Oswald's uncle) went on horseback to the house where she was staying, seized her and took her out of the kingdom. He then urged Eadwig to abandon his wicked ways, and henceforth the king "knelt before Oda with contrite visage". Some historians regard this story as a version of the account of Eadwig's marriage, but Keynes thinks that different stories about Eadwig and his women may have been conflated.

Historians almost all accept that the marriage between Eadwig and Ælfgifu was dissolved, but Stenton was an exception, pointing out that ASC D, which is a northern document dating to the second half of the eleventh century or the early twelfth, is the only source for the annulment. (Note: The twelfth century chronicler John of Worcester stated that Oda separated Eadwig and Ælfgifu, but John was uncertain whether this was because they were too closely related or they were unmarried.) In his view it "is too late to have authority on a subject which invited legendary accretions".

=== Early reign 955–957 ===
Eadwig's predecessor Eadred suffered from ill health which became much worse in his last years, and he relied on key advisers, including his mother Eadgifu, Archbishop Oda, Abbot Dunstan of Glastonbury, Ælfsige, whom he appointed Bishop of Winchester, and Æthelstan, Ealdorman of East Anglia, who was so powerful that he was known as the Half-King. Most surviving charters of the last two years of Eadred's reign were produced at Glastonbury Abbey, and almost all of these were not attested by the king, suggesting that Dunstan was authorised to issue charters in Eadred's name when he was too ill to carry out his duties. When Eadwig succeeded, the court was ruled by powerful factions. He appears to have been determined to show his independence from the previous regime from the start: the historian Ben Snook comments that "Eadwig, unlike his brother Edgar, was clearly his own man. Immediately on coming to power, he acted to put a stop to all this." However, in the view of Keynes, "whether Eadwig and Edgar were able to assert their own independence of action, or remained at the mercy of established interests at court, is unclear".

Eadred was buried in the Old Minster, Winchester even though his will suggests that this location was not his choice. (Note: Eadred made bequests to an unspecified location where "he wishes his body to rest", and then property to the Old Minster, implying that they were different places.) He probably wished to be buried at a reformed Benedictine monastery such as Glastonbury, but Eadwig may have wanted to ensure that his tomb would not become a focus for opponents such as Dunstan. The main beneficiary in Eadred's will was his mother Eadgifu, and Eadwig was not mentioned. She does not appear to have received the bequest as she later complained that she had been "despoiled of all her property", on Eadwig's accession, perhaps because he resented her power. Eadgifu had frequently attested charters in the reigns of her sons Edmund and Eadred, but she attested only one of Eadwig's, whereas Edgar was prominent at his brother's court between 955 and 957, attesting many of his charters. The position of Æthelstan Half-King was too strong for Eadwig to be able to remove him, but in 956 Eadwig appointed several new ealdormen covering parts of the area in Æthelstan's jurisdiction, including Æthelstan's eldest son Æthelwold, perhaps presaging a rearrangement.

Historians have often been critical of Eadwig, portraying him as irresponsible or incompetent, and the key evidence cited for this view is the exceptional number of charters he issued in 956. His sixty-odd gifts of land in that year make up around five percent of all genuine Anglo-Saxon charters, and no other ruler in Europe is known to have matched that yearly total before the twelfth century. They were mainly in favour of laymen, and it is possible that some church land was being alienated, but only a few estates are known to have formerly been in religious ownership. Historians sometimes assume that he was giving away royal property in order to buy support, but again there is little evidence for this. He may have been selling privileges, allowing landholders to convert folkland, which they already owned as hereditary family estates which owed food, rent and services to the crown, into bookland which was exempt from most obligations, thus making money but reducing the income of the crown in the long term. However, many of the estates had recently been the subject of royal charters, which means they must have already been bookland, and suggests that in some cases he may have been seizing estates and selling or giving them to his favourites. Ann Williams observes that the large number of charters may indicate that Eadwig had to buy support, but too little is known about the background to be sure. The wealth of the crown was so great that the grants do not seem to have significantly depleted its resources.

Some of the hostility towards Eadwig was probably due to his promotion of his friends, especially Ælfhere, at the expense of the old guard, such as Dunstan. Ælfhere and his brothers were acknowledged by several kings as relatives, but the nature of the relationship is unknown. They were close to Eadwig and he made the eldest, Ælfheah, his seneschal. Ælfheah and his wife Ælfswith, who was also acknowledged by Eadwig as a relative, benefited from his generosity. Ælfhere, who was to become the pre-eminent lay magnate until his death in 983, was appointed an ealdorman in Mercia in 956. Other ealdormen appointed in the first year of Eadwig's reign were Æthelstan Rota in Mercia and Æthelstan Half-King's son Æthelwold in East Anglia, while Byrhtnoth, the future hero of the Battle of Maldon, became ealdorman of Essex. These were sound appointments of men from established families and Edgar kept them when he came to power, but the rivalries between the families of Ælfhere and Æthelstan Half-King's son Æthelwine were to destabilise the country and broke into open hostilities after Edgar's death.

The titles given to kings Edmund and Eadred in charters varied, with the most common being "king of the English". In Eadwig's charters issued before the division of the kingdom in 957, he was variously styled king of "the Anglo-Saxons", "the English", "Albion" and "the whole of Britain". Oda's attestations during Edmund's and Eadred's reigns had been longer and more boastful than those of the king, but these were cut down during Eadwig's time, no longer allowing him to overshadow his royal master.

=== Division of the kingdom 957–959 ===
In the summer of 957, the kingdom was divided between Eadwig in the south and Edgar in the north, with the River Thames forming the boundary. According to "B", "King Eadwig was totally abandoned by the people north [of the Thames]. They despised him for his imprudent discharge of the power entrusted to him. The wise and sensible he destroyed in a spirit of idle hatred, replacing them with ignoramuses like himself to whom he took a liking."

Until the late twentieth century most historians blamed the division on Eadwig's incompetent rule. William Hunt in his entry on Eadwig in the original Dictionary of National Biography, published in 1889, stated that Eadwig carried on the government foolishly and provoked the Mercians and Northumbrians to rebellion by favouring the West Saxons. In 1922, J. Armitage Robinson saw the division as the result of a revolt by the Mercians against Eadwig's misrule, and in 1984 Henry Loyn attributed the division to Eadwig having "alienated responsible ecclesiastical opinion". Stenton commented that it was probably through "mere irresponsibility" that Eadwig lost the greater part of his kingdom, that in the society of his West Saxon friends it is likely that he lost touch with the aristocracy of remoter areas. In the twenty first century, Christopher Lewis sees the division as the solution to "a dangerously unstable government and a court in deep crisis", while Miller and Naismith attribute it to an unsuccessful attempt to promote a powerful new faction at the expense of the old guard.

Other historians reject the view that the division was caused by Eadwig's failures. Four versions of the Anglo-Saxon Chronicle mention the division of the kingdom, and they all describe it as the "succession" of Edgar to the kingship of the Mercians, as if it was a normal and expected event. ASC D and ASC F date the division to 955, whereas ASC B and ASC C correctly date it to 957. In Barbara Yorke's view, the difference in dates may be because it was always intended that Edgar would rule Mercia as a sub-king, but he was unable to act in person until he came of age when he reached the age of fourteen in 957. The Worcester charter S 633 (Note: A charter's S number is its number in Peter Sawyer's catalogue of Anglo-Saxon charters, available online at the Electronic Sawyer.) of 956 (see the "Charters" section below) describes Edgar as regulus (underking). Charters of 957 to 959 suggest that the division was a peaceful political settlement: ealdormen and bishops with jurisdictions south of the Thames stayed with Eadwig and those with northern ones with Edgar, including those who had been promoted by Eadwig. Almost all thegns who attested his charters before the division were loyal to him after it. Both Edgar's prominence as an attester of charters up to the division, and his retention as king of Mercia of ealdormen appointed by Eadwig, are evidence of continuity, and that the division of the kingdom was not a coup against Eadwig. Keynes considers both views of the division of the kingdom plausible, commenting that it may have been the result of dissatisfaction with Eadwig's rule north of the Thames, but on the other hand there would have been no presumption at that period that political unity was desirable for its own sake, and it may always have been intended that Eadwig would share the kingship with his brother.

Eadwig seems to have retained some seniority. He is described as "King of the English" in his charters, a title which Edgar only occasionally used; Edgar was mostly "King of the Mercians", and rarely also of the Northumbrians and the Britons. All coins, including those issued in Mercia, were in Eadwig's name until his death, and the historian Frederick Biggs comments that if Edgar had seized control of Mercia, it is unlikely that he would have allowed Eadwig to keep control over the area's coinage. Biggs sees the division as a survival of the early Anglo-Saxon tradition of joint kingship. Benedictine reformers such as Æthelwold opposed division because they wanted uniform monastic observance, which would be jeopardised if different kings supported different practices. Æthelwold criticised Eadwig for dividing the kingdom and praised Edgar for bringing it "back to oneness".

There is no evidence of rivalry between the brothers, but there were disagreements. Soon after becoming king of Mercia Edgar recalled Dunstan from his exile, and he showed his disapproval of Eadwig's treatment of their grandmother by restoring her property when he acceded to the throne of England in 959. Æthelstan Half-King appears to have retired around the time of the division; he had been Edgar's foster-father and he may have thought it was the right time to hand over his responsibilities. As Ælfhere was a Mercian ealdorman, he served under Edgar when the kingdom was divided even though he had been appointed by Eadwig, and he became Edgar's senior ealdorman.

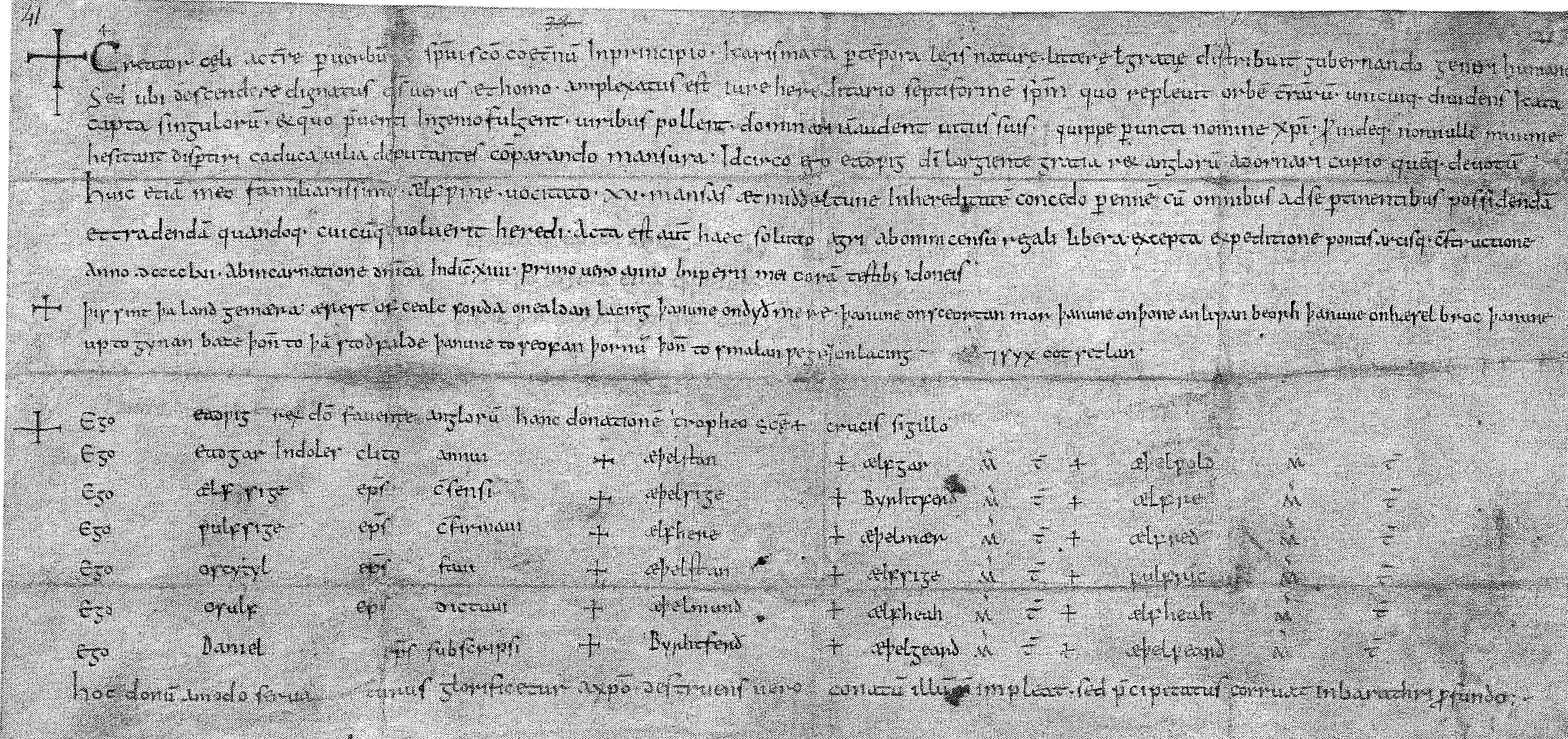
Charter S 594: Eadwig to his familiar, Ælfwine, in 956

Little is known of Eadwig after the division of the kingdom. A man called Ælfric became an ealdorman in the south-east in 957, but he probably died in 958. Eadmund, probably Ealdorman of the Western Shires, had usually attested second among the lay magnates after Æthelstan before the division, and after it he moved up to first in Eadwig's charters until Ælfhere's brother Ælfheah was promoted from seneschal to Ealdorman of Central Wessex shortly before Eadwig died, and immediately went to the head of the lay attesters.

=== Charters ===
Most charters in the mid-tenth century were written in a style known as the "diplomatic mainstream", but there were also two other traditions, one associated with Dunstan, the Dunstan B charters, and the other with Cenwald, Bishop of Worcester, called the alliterative charters. Almost all charters of Eadwig's reign are mainstream. There are Dunstan B charters dating to the reigns of Eadred and Edgar, but none of Eadwig, while only one alliterative charter (S 633) of Eadwig is known, a grant to Worcester minster. His charters were probably drawn up by a central writing office in the king's household which had existed since the 930s. About ninety charters survive, an exceptionally large number, but analysis is limited because only seven are original documents, with the rest being later copies. The sixty dating to 956 seem to have been mainly issued on four occasions, on his coronation in late January, on around 13 February, on a third occasion which cannot be dated, and on about 29 November. (Note: The charters of 956 are discussed in detail by Keynes in The Diplomas of King Æthelred the Unready and Eadwig's Mercian charters by Cyril Hart in The Danelaw.)

=== Coinage ===
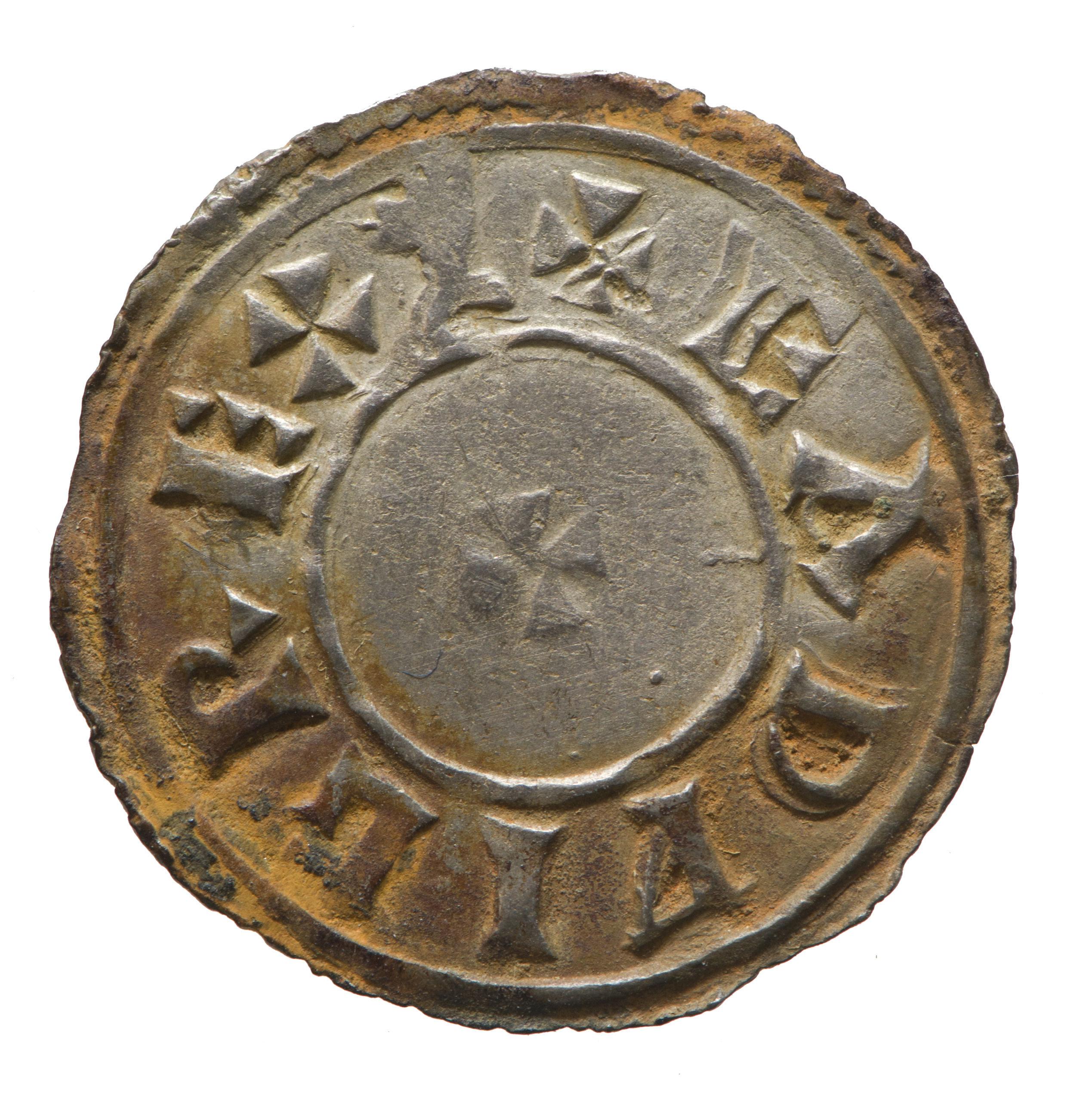
Silver penny, obverse, inscribed 'EADǷIG REX'

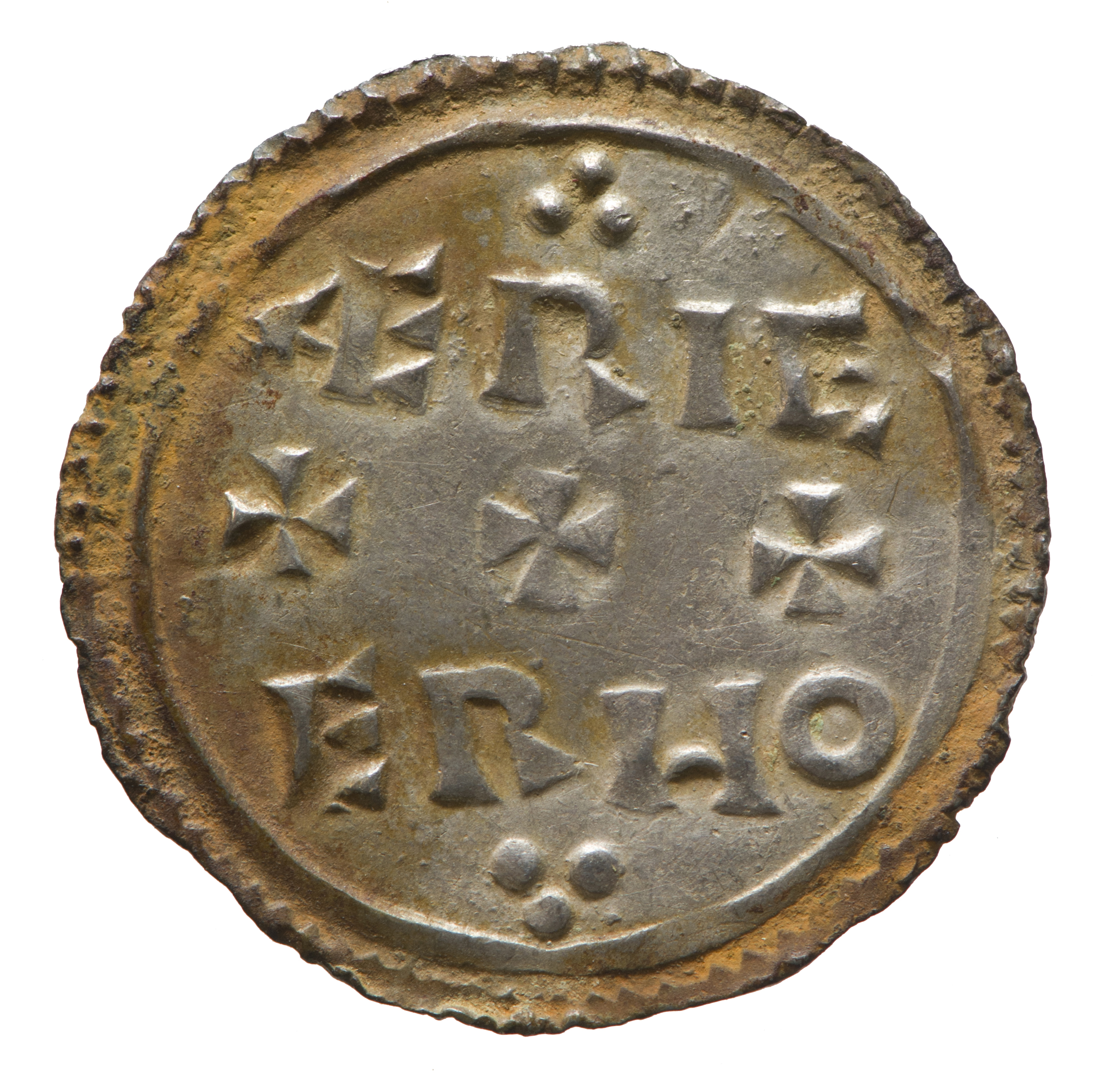
HT1 style reverse inscribed 'HERIGER MO'. Heriger was a York moneyer.

The only coin in common use in late Anglo-Saxon England was the silver penny. The horizontal coin designs (with the moneyer's name horizontally on the reverse) in Eadwig's reign followed the three basic horizontal types of Eadred, HT1, HR1 and HR2. (Note: HT coins have a reverse which has the moneyer's name shown Horizontally in two lines and Trefoils top and bottom. Variant 1 has three crosses in the middle (see illustration above). HR coins have Rosettes instead of trefoils, and HR2 has a circle, a cross and a circle instead of three crosses.) There were also additional horizontal types. Many HT1 coins were produced in the Midlands and South by some 35 moneyers, 17 of whom showed the mint town. There was an unexpectedly high number of HT1 coins from two York moneyers considering the shortness of Eadwig's reign, and 13 moneyers in the rest of north-east England.

Eadwig's reign saw several typological developments: especially the revival in London of the Bust Crowned, with a crude portrait of the king on the obverse, and in the south-west of the Circumscription Cross, with a cross on both sides of the coin in the centre and the inscriptions round the edge. These were both produced in very limited numbers, but foreshadowed more extensive use in Edgar's reign. East Anglian moneyers had generally used the Bust Crowned design since the reign of Æthelstan, but may have switched temporarily to Horizontal types under Eadwig. The weight of the coins continued a gradual decline since the reign of Edward the Elder. The high silver content in the period of 85–95% was generally maintained, but as under Eadred there were a few less fine coins produced.

There is no evidence that coins were struck in the name of Edgar during Eadwig's reign, and coins of Eadwig in Mercia and Northumbria were much more common than would be expected if some had been struck in Edgar's name in 957–959, indicating that all coins were struck in Eadwig's name throughout his reign.

=== Religion ===
During Edgar's reign, the Benedictine reform movement with monasteries following strict rules of celibacy and prohibition of personal property, became dominant in religion and politics. Kings before Edgar were sympathetic to its ideals, but they did not take the view of Bishop Æthelwold and his circle that it was the only worthwhile religious life, and that the secular clergy (clerks), who owned property and many of whom were married, were corrupt and immoral. Like Edmund and Eadred, Eadwig donated both to communities of Benedictine monks and of secular clergy, but he was later portrayed as an enemy of the movement who despoiled the monasteries and favoured the secular clergy. According to the Benedictine chronicler William of Malmesbury, writing in the twelfth century:

For soon, with the support of his pitiful toadies, [Eadwig] plunged all men of the monastic order all over England into undeserved calamities, first stripping them of the support of their revenues and then driving them into exile. Dunstan himself as head of all the monks was sent packing into Flanders. That was a time when all monasteries wore an unkempt and pitiful air. Even the convent of Malmesbury, where monks had dwelt for over two hundred and seventy years, he made into a bawdy house for clerks. But you, O Lord Jesus, our creator and re-creator, a skilled artificer well able to reform our deformities, used these unruly and wandering persons to bring to light and public knowledge your treasure that for so many years lay hidden – I mean the body of St Aldhelm, which they themselves raised from the ground and established in a shrine. The prestige of those clerks was further enhanced by royal generosity, which gave the saint an estate admirably adapted both by its size and by its convenient position. All the same, even at this distance, it is horrible to remember how cruelly the king behaved to the other monasteries, being himself young and foolish, and moved too by the advice of his mistress, who constantly laid siege to his childish mind.

Eadwig gave land to Æthelwold's Abingdon in many charters, leading him to be later regarded by its monks as one of its greatest royal benefactors. He is also named as a benefactor of Abingdon in a charter of 993. The construction of a new church was commenced by Eadred and completed under Edgar, but a charter of Eadwig granting Abingdon a wood for building the church suggests that the work continued during his reign. Æthelwold sided with Eadwig over his marriage against Oda and Dunstan and Eadwig probably sent Edgar to be tutored by Æthelwold. Religious reform does not appear to have been an important issue for Edgar and his advisers in 958, when he granted estates to the unreformed house of secular clerks at the minster church of St Werburgh in Chester, but in the 970s Benedictine reformers rewrote the history of the 950s and presented Edgar's accession as a victory for the movement over the unfit rule of Eadwig. Æthelwold wrote that Eadwig "through the ignorance of childhood [...] distributed the lands of the holy churches to rapacious strangers". Eadwig's gifts to monasteries are numerous enough to show that he was not hostile to them, and his reputation as an opponent seems to be due to the fact that he regarded Dunstan as a personal enemy. Some early sources, such as Dunstan's biographer B and Byrhtferth, criticised Eadwig but do not list spoliation of the church among his crimes, and he was selected by some monastic forgers as the grantor of estates to their establishments, showing that he was considered a plausible benefactor.

In addition to Malmesbury and Abingdon, Eadwig gave land to Worcester Minster and Bampton Minster. Estates at Beccles and Elmswell which he gave to Bury St Edmunds were still in the abbey's hands at the time of the Domesday Book. He also gave land to the Bishop of London and the Archbishop of Canterbury. Southwell Minster was founded on a large estate which Eadwig gave to Oscytel, Bishop of Dorchester in 956. (Note: Southwell was probably transferred to the archbishopric of York when Oscytel was appointed archbishop in 958 or 959.)

Eadwig's close allies included Ælfsige, who had been appointed Bishop of Winchester by Eadred in 951. Ælfsige was a wealthy married man with a son, who had strong connections with the West Saxon aristocracy. He described Ælfhere's brother, Ælfheah, as "my beloved friend", and appointed him guardian of his son. Ælfsige was also close to another supporter of Eadwig, Wulfric Cufing, and left him an estate in his will. Ælfsige's lifestyle made him abhorrent to the reformers. He was an enemy of Oda, and Byrhtferth accused him of gloating over Oda's death and striking his tomb with his staff. When Oda died in 958, Eadwig appointed Ælfsige as Archbishop of Canterbury, but he froze to death in the Alps on the way to Rome to collect his pallium. Eadwig then translated Bishop Byrhthelm of Wells to Canterbury, but when Edgar succeeded he dismissed Byrhthelm in favour of Dunstan.

== Death ==
Eadwig died on 1 October 959 and was buried in the New Minster, Winchester, which had been built by Edward the Elder to serve as a royal mausoleum. Alfred and Edward were buried there, but the only later royal entombment was that of Eadwig, associating his reign with that of his illustrious ancestors.

== Reputation ==
"B"'s condemnation of Eadwig has influenced later opinion. From soon after his death, most judgments of him were harsh, amounting in the view of the historian Shashi Jayakumar to "a type of damnatio memoriae". The hostile views of Eadwig in the lives of Saints Dunstan and Oswald were adopted by post-Conquest hagiographers and monastic chroniclers. According to John of Worcester, "Eadwig, king of the English, since he behaved foolishly in the government entrusted to him, was abandoned by the Mercians and the Northumbrians with contempt". To William of Malmesbury he "was a wanton youth, and one who misused his personal beauty in lascivious behaviour".

Some contemporaries were more sympathetic. Æthelweard, who may have been Eadwig's brother-in-law, wrote that "he for his great beauty got the nickname "All-fair" from the common people. He held the kingdom continuously for four years, and deserved to be loved." The New Minster, where he was buried, also remembered him favourably, saying in its tenth century history that he was "mourned by many tears of his people". The Minster was a beneficiary of Ælfgifu's will, and its Liber Vitæ is one of the few sources to describe her as Eadwig's wife. In the late tenth or early eleventh century, a slave was freed in his memory at St Petroc's Church in Cornwall. Æthelred the Unready named his sons after his predecessors, and his fifth son was named Eadwig.

Modern historians generally reject "B"'s verdict. Williams sees his comments as "mere spite" from a partisan of Dunstan. Snook says that "B" "conducted a comprehensive hatchet-job on Eadwig's reputation, portraying him as an incompetent, lecherous, vengeful, impious tyrant". "B" and his successors wrote "all manner of puerile prattle about his impiety and his unsuitability for high office". In Keynes's view:

Eadwig has acquired a reputation as a debaucher, an opponent of monasticism, a despoiler of the church, and an incompetent ruler, which derives from the account of him in the earliest life of St Dunstan [by B], written c. 1000, and from later sources which elaborate the same themes. It is the case, however, that Eadwig quarrelled with Dunstan, and sent him into exile; and it may be doubted whether a life of the saint would provide impartial evidence for the life of the king.

Stafford comments:

Eadwig left no family to cultivate his memory, was too easy a target for the moralists-in-politics of the late tenth century. The circumstances of his brief reign were complex and some arguments against him must have been strictly contemporary, part of the debate about succession which took place between 955 and 957. At best we have received only half of those arguments, those used to bury Eadwig not to praise him.

Snook gives the most favourable modern verdict:

Eadwig was an unusually generous king who appears to have managed the emerging factional rivalries amongst the English nobility with remarkable dexterity and political acumen, arguably preserving peace, if not unity, in the kingdom and avoiding the devastating infighting that would tear England apart during the reign of Æthelred the Unready [...] What seems clear is that, at this time, the kingdom's leading ecclesiastics, emboldened by the ideology of the monastic reform movement, were keen to enhance their personal and political influence at the expense of the king's authority.

Other historians are more cautious. Williams comments that "much is still obscure about the politics of Eadwig's reign", and Richard Huscroft agrees, saying that "the evidence about Eadwig's reign remains obscure and ambiguous".

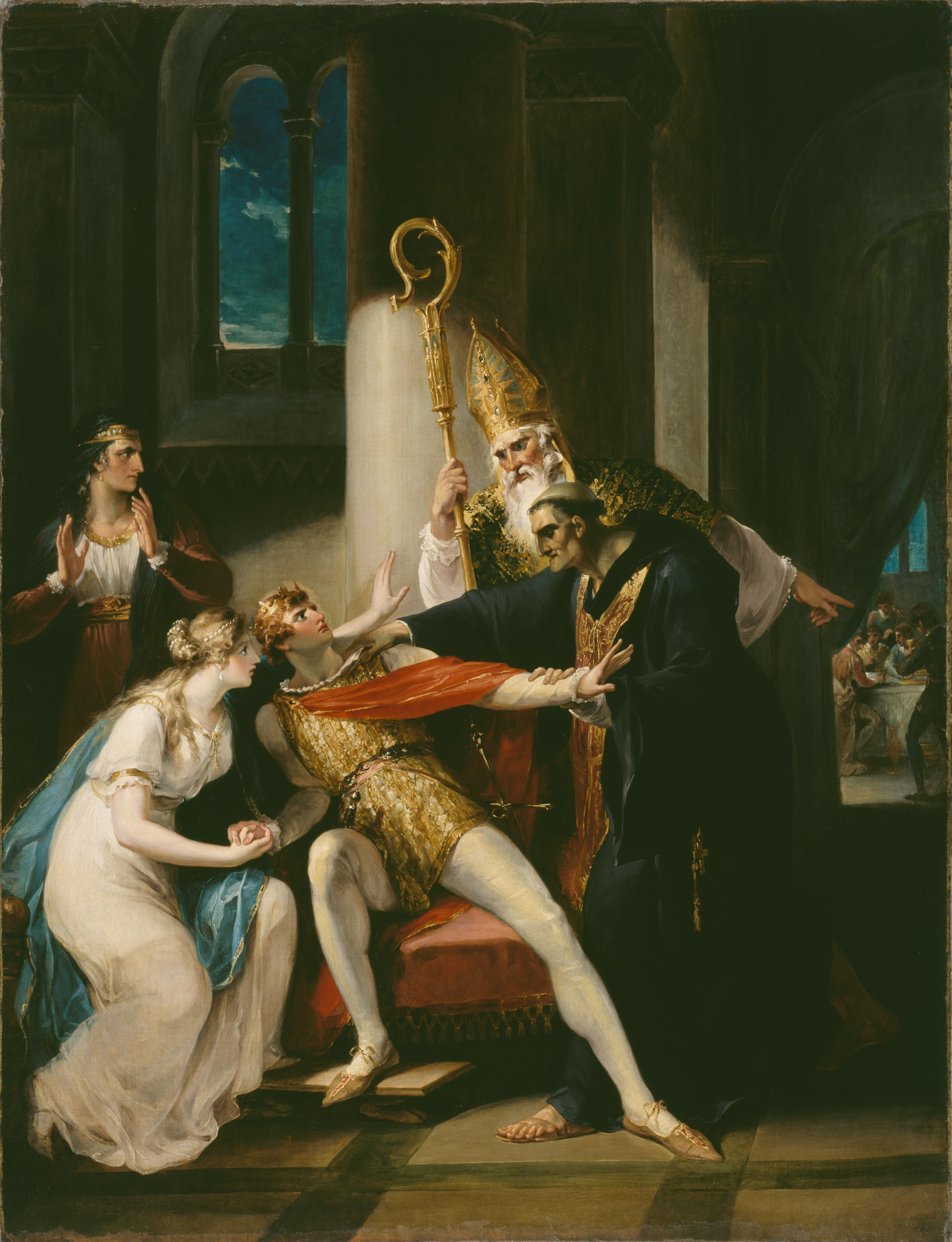
Edwy and Elgiva, A Scene from Saxon History; William Hamilton, 1793

== In art and literature ==
The story of Eadwig and Ælfgifu was a popular subject for artists, playwrights and poets in the second half of the eighteenth century and the first half of the nineteenth. Artists included William Bromley, who showed his The Insolence of Dunstan to King Edwy at the Royal Academy, William Hamilton (see image), William Dyce and Richard Dadd, while there were poems such as Edwy: a Dramatic Poem by Thomas Warwick in 1784. Another poem, Thomas Sedgwick Whalley's Edwy and Edilda, was published in 1779. Fanny Burney's play, Edwy and Elgiva, was performed at the Drury Lane Theatre on 21 March 1795 with Charles Kemble as Edwy and Sarah Siddons as Elgiva, but closed after one disastrous performance.

== Sources ==
- Abels, Richard (2004). "Byrhtnoth [Brihtnoth] (d. 991)". Oxford Dictionary of National Biography. Oxford University Press. doi:10.1093/ref:odnb/3429. ISBN 978-0-19-861412-8. (subscription, Wikipedia Library access or UK public library membership required)
- Barrow, Julia (2004). "Oscytel [Oskytel] (d. 971)". Oxford Dictionary of National Biography. Oxford University Press. doi:10.1093/ref:odnb/20897. ISBN 978-0-19-861412-8. (subscription, Wikipedia Library access or UK public library membership required)
- Biggs, Frederick (2008). "Edgar's Path to the Throne". In Scragg, Donald (ed.). Edgar King of the English: New Interpretations. Woodbridge, Suffolk: The Boydell Press. pp. 124–139. ISBN 978-1-84383-399-4.
- Blair, John (1984). "Saint Beornwald of Bampton" (PDF). Oxoniensia. 49: 47–56. ISSN 0308-5562. Archived (PDF) from the original on 30 May 2012.
- Blair, John (2005). The Church in Anglo-Saxon Society. Oxford, UK: Oxford University Press. ISBN 978-0-19-921117-3.
- Blunt, Christopher; Stewart, Ian; Lyon, Stewart (1989). Coinage in Tenth Century England: From Edward the Elder to Edgar's Reform. Oxford, UK: Oxford University Press. ISBN 978-0-19-726060-9.
- Bouchard, Constance (1981). "Consanguinity and Noble Marriages in the Tenth and Eleventh Centuries". Speculum. 56 (2): 268–287. doi:10.2307/2846935. ISSN 0038-7134. JSTOR 2846935. PMID 11610836. S2CID 38717048.
- Brooks, Nicholas (1984). The Early History of the Church of Canterbury. Leicester: Leicester University Press. ISBN 978-0-7185-1182-1.
- Brooks, Nicholas (1992). "The Career of St Dunstan". In Ramsay, Nigel; Sparks, Margaret; Tatton-Brown, Tim (eds.). St Dunstan: His Life, Times and Cult. Woodbridge, Suffolk: The Boydell Press. pp. 1–23. ISBN 978-0-85115-301-8.
- Campbell, Alistair, ed. (1962). The Chronicle of Æthelweard (in Latin and English). London, UK: Thomas Nelson and Son Ltd. OCLC 245905467.
- Cooper, Tracy-Anne (2015). Monk-Bishops and the English Benedictine Reform Movement. Toronto: Pontifical Institute of Mediaeval Studies. ISBN 978-0-88844-193-5.
- Courtney, W. P.; Mills, Rebecca (2021). "Whalley, Thomas Sedgwick (1746–1828)". Oxford Dictionary of National Biography. Oxford University Press. doi:10.1093/ref:odnb/29162. ISBN 978-0-19-861412-8. (subscription, Wikipedia Library access or UK public library membership required)
- Cubbin, G. P., ed. (1996). The Anglo-Saxon Chronicle, A Collaborative Edition, 6, MS D. Cambridge, UK: D. S. Brewer. ISBN 978-0-85991-467-3.
- Cubitt, Catherine (1997). "The Tenth-Century Benedictine Reform in England". Early Medieval Europe. 6 (1): 77–94. doi:10.1111/1468-0254.00004. ISSN 0963-9462. S2CID 161695919.
- Darby, Barbara (Spring 1997). "Feminism, Tragedy, and Frances Burney's Edwy and Elgiva". Journal of Dramatic Theory and Criticism. XI (2): 3–23. ISSN 2165-2686.
- Darlington, R. R.; McGurk, Patrick, eds. (1995). The Chronicle of John of Worcester (in Latin and English). Vol. 2. Oxford: Clarendon Press. ISBN 978-0-19-822261-3.
- D'Avray, David (2014). Dissolving Royal Marriages: A Documentary History 860–1600. Cambridge, UK: Cambridge University Press. ISBN 978-1-107-64399-4.
- Foot, Sarah (2011). "Æthelstan (Athelstan) (893/4–939), king of England". Oxford Dictionary of National Biography. Oxford University Press. doi:10.1093/ref:odnb/833. (subscription, Wikipedia Library access or UK public library membership required)
- Grierson, Philip; Blackburn, Mark (1986). Medieval European Coinage. Cambridge, UK: Cambridge University Press. ISBN 978-0-521-03177-6.
- Haddan, Arthur; Stubbs, William, eds. (1869). Councils and Ecclesiastical Documents Relating to Great Britain and Ireland. Vol. I. Oxford, UK: Clarendon Press. OCLC 1046288968.
- Harmer, Florence, ed. (1914). Select English Historical Documents of the Ninth and Tenth Centuries (in Latin and English). Cambridge, UK: Cambridge University Press. OCLC 1161790266.
- Hart, Cyril (1966). The Early Charters of Eastern England. Leicester, UK: Leicester University Press. OCLC 645356664.
- Hart, Cyril (1992). The Danelaw. London, UK: The Hambledon Press. ISBN 978-1-85285-044-9.
- Hart, Cyril (2005). "Æthelwine [Ethelwine, Æthelwine Dei Amicus] (d. 992)". Oxford Dictionary of National Biography. Oxford University Press. doi:10.1093/ref:odnb/8919. ISBN 978-0-19-861412-8. (subscription, Wikipedia Library access or UK public library membership required)
- Hunt, William (1889). "Edwy or Eadwig (d. 959)". Dictionary of National Biography. Vol. XVII. London, UK: Smith, Elder & Co. p. 140. OCLC 33239034.
- Huscroft, Richard (2019). Making England 796–1042. Abingdon, Oxfordshire: Routledge. ISBN 978-1-138-18246-2.
- Jayakumar, Shashi (2008). "Eadwig and Edgar: Politics, Propaganda, Faction". In Scragg, Donald (ed.). Edgar King of the English: New Interpretations. Woodbridge, Suffolk: The Boydell Press. pp. 83–103. ISBN 978-1-84383-399-4.
- John, Eric (1966). Orbis Britanniae. Leicester: Leicester University Press. OCLC 867807941.
- Jones, Arthur (1958). Anglo-Saxon Worcester. Worcester, UK: Ebenezer Baylis & Son Ltd. OCLC 562036457.
- Kelly, Susan, ed. (1996). Charters of Shaftesbury Abbey. Anglo-Saxon Charters. Oxford, UK: Oxford University Press for the British Academy. ISBN 978-0-19-726151-4.
- Kelly, Susan, ed. (2001). Charters of Abingdon Abbey Part 2. Anglo-Saxon Charters. Oxford, UK: Oxford University Press for the British Academy. ISBN 978-0-19-726221-4.
- Kelly, Susan, ed. (2004). Charters of St Paul's, London. Anglo-Saxon Charters. Vol. 10. Oxford, UK: Oxford University Press for the British Academy. ISBN 978-0-19-726299-3.
- Keynes, Simon (1980). The Diplomas of King Æthelred the Unready 978–1016. Cambridge, UK: Cambridge University Press. ISBN 978-0-521-02308-5.
- Keynes, Simon; Lapidge, Michael, eds. (1983). Alfred the Great: Asser's Life of King Alfred & Other Contemporary Sources. London, UK: Penguin Classics. ISBN 978-0-14-044409-4.
- Keynes, Simon (1985). "King Æthelstan's books". In Lapidge, Michael; Gneuss, Helmut (eds.). Learning and Literature in Anglo-Saxon England. Cambridge, UK: Cambridge University Press. pp. 143–201. ISBN 978-0-521-25902-6.
- Keynes, Simon (1994). "The "Dunstan B" Charters". Anglo-Saxon England. 23: 165–193. doi:10.1017/S026367510000452X. ISSN 0263-6751. S2CID 161883384.
- Keynes, Simon (1999). "England, c. 900–1016". In Reuter, Timothy (ed.). The New Cambridge Medieval History. Vol. III. Cambridge, UK: Cambridge University Press. pp. 456–484. ISBN 978-0-521-36447-8.
- Keynes, Simon (2002). An Atlas of Attestations in Anglo-Saxon Charters, c.670–1066. Cambridge, UK: Dept. of Anglo-Saxon, Norse, and Celtic, University of Cambridge, UK. ISBN 978-0-9532697-6-1.
- Keynes, Simon (2004). "Eadwig [Edwy] (c. 940–959)". Oxford Dictionary of National Biography. Oxford University Press. doi:10.1093/ref:odnb/8572. ISBN 978-0-19-861412-8. (subscription, Wikipedia Library access or UK public library membership required)
- Keynes, Simon (2008a). "Edgar rex admirabilis". In Scragg, Donald (ed.). Edgar King of the English: New Interpretations. Woodbridge, Suffolk: The Boydell Press. pp. 3–58. ISBN 978-1-84383-399-4.
- Keynes, Simon (2008b). "A Conspectus of the Charters of King Edgar 957–975". In Scragg, Donald (ed.). Edgar King of the English: New Interpretations. Woodbridge, Suffolk: The Boydell Press. pp. 60–80. ISBN 978-1-84383-399-4.
- Keynes, Simon (2009). "Edward the Ætheling". In Mortimer, Richard (ed.). Edward the Confessor: The Man and the Legend. Woodbridge, Suffolk: The Boydell Press. pp. 42–62. ISBN 978-1-84383-436-6.
- Keynes, Simon (2013). "Church Councils, Royal Assemblies and Anglo-Saxon Royal Diplomas". In Owen-Crocker, Gale; Schneider, Brian (eds.). Kingship, Legislation and Power in Anglo-Saxon England. Woodbridge, Suffolk: The Boydell Press. pp. 17–182. ISBN 978-1-84383-877-7.
- Lapidge, Michael, ed. (2009). Byrhtferth of Ramsey: The Lives of St Oswald and St Ecgwine (in Latin and English). Oxford, UK: Clarendon Press. ISBN 978-0-19-955078-4.
- Lavelle, Ryan (2008). Aethelred II: King of the English (2nd ed.). Stroud, Gloucestershire: The History Press. ISBN 978-0-7524-4678-3.
- Lewis, Christopher (2008). "Edgar, Chester and the Kingdom of the Mercians, 957–959". In Scragg, Donald (ed.). Edgar King of the English: New Interpretations. Woodbridge, Suffolk: The Boydell Press. pp. 104–123. ISBN 978-1-84383-399-4.
- Loyn, Henry (1984). The Governance of Anglo-Saxon England 500–1087. London, UK: Edward Arnold. ISBN 978-0-7131-6376-6.
- Marafioti, Nicole (2014). The King's Body: Burial and Succession in Late Anglo-Saxon England. Toronto, Canada: University of Toronto Press. ISBN 978-1-4426-4758-9.
- Miller, Sean, ed. (2001). Charters of the New Minster, Winchester. Anglo-Saxon Charters. Oxford, UK: Oxford University Press for the British Academy. ISBN 978-0-19-726223-8.
- Miller, Sean (2011). "Edward [called Edward the Elder] (870s?–924), king of the Anglo-Saxons". Oxford Dictionary of National Biography. Oxford University Press. doi:10.1093/ref:odnb/8514. (subscription, Wikipedia Library access or UK public library membership required)
- Miller, Sean (2014). "Eadwig". In Lapidge, Michael; Blair, John; Keynes, Simon; Scragg, Donald (eds.). The Wiley Blackwell Encyclopedia of Anglo-Saxon England (Second ed.). Chichester, West Sussex: Wiley Blackwell. pp. 155–156. ISBN 978-0-470-65632-7.
- Miller, Sean (n.d.). "Eadwig All-Fair, king of England (955 [cons. 26 January 956] – 1 October 959) (kingdom divided with Edgar, 957)". anglo-saxons.net.
- Molyneaux, George (2015). The Formation of the English Kingdom in the Tenth Century. Oxford, UK: Oxford University Press. ISBN 978-0-19-871791-1.
- Morris, Rosemary (2014). "The Problems of Property". In Noble, Thomas. F. X.; Smith, Julia M. H. (eds.). Early Medieval Christianities c. 600 – 1100. The Cambridge History of Christianity. Vol. 3. New York, NY: Cambridge University Press. pp. 327–344. ISBN 978-1-107-42364-0.
- Mynors, Roger; Thomson, R. M.; Winterbottom, M., eds. (1998). William of Malmesbury: Gesta Regum Anglorum, The History of the English Kings (in Latin and English). Vol. I. Oxford, UK: Clarendon Press. ISBN 978-0-19-820678-1.
- Naismith, Rory (2014a). "Money". In Lapidge, Michael; Blair, John; Keynes, Simon; Scragg, Donald (eds.). The Wiley Blackwell Encyclopedia of Anglo-Saxon England (Second ed.). Chichester, UK: Blackwell Publishing. pp. 329–330. ISBN 978-0-470-65632-7.
- Naismith, Rory (2014b). "Prelude to Reform: Tenth-Century English Coinage in Perspective". In Naismith, Rory; Allen, Martin; Screen, Elina (eds.). Early Medieval Monetary History: Studies in Memory of Mark Blackburn. Abingdon, Oxfordshire: Routledge. pp. 39–83. ISBN 978-0-367-59999-7.
- Naismith, Rory (2021). Early Medieval Britain, c. 500–1000. Cambridge, UK: Cambridge University Press. ISBN 978-1-108-44025-7.
- Roach, Levi (2013). Kingship and Consent in Anglo-Saxon England, 871–978. Cambridge, UK: Cambridge University Press. ISBN 978-1-107-03653-6.
- Robertson, Agnes, ed. (1925). The Laws of the Kings of England from Edmund to Henry I. Cambridge, UK: Cambridge University Press. OCLC 271025606.
- Robertson, Agnes, ed. (1956). Anglo-Saxon Charters (2nd ed.). Cambridge, UK: Cambridge University Press. OCLC 504288415.
- Robinson, J. Armitage (1923). The Times of Saint Dunstan. Oxford, UK: Oxford University Press. OCLC 465868546.
- Snook, Ben (2015). The Anglo-Saxon Chancery: The History, Language and Production of Anglo-Saxon Charters from Alfred to Edgar. Woodbridge, Suffolk: The Boydell Press. ISBN 978-1-78327-006-4.
- Stafford, Pauline (1981). "The King's Wife in Wessex 800–1066". Past and Present (91): 3–27. doi:10.1093/past/91.1.3. ISSN 0031-2746.
- Stafford, Pauline (1989). Unification and Conquest. A Political and Social History of England in the Tenth and Eleventh Centuries. London, UK: Edward Arnold. ISBN 978-0-7131-6532-6.
- Stafford, Pauline (1998). Queens, Concubines and Dowagers: The King's Wife in the Early Middle Ages (Paperback ed.). London, UK: Leicester University Press. ISBN 978-0-7185-0174-7.
- Stafford, Pauline (2004a). "Ælfgifu (fl. 956–966)". Oxford Dictionary of National Biography. Oxford University Press. doi:10.1093/ref:odnb/179. ISBN 978-0-19-861412-8. (subscription, Wikipedia Library access or UK public library membership required)
- Stafford, Pauline (2004b). "Eadgifu". Oxford Dictionary of National Biography. Oxford University Press. doi:10.1093/ref:odnb/52307. ISBN 978-0-19-861412-8. (subscription, Wikipedia Library access or UK public library membership required)
- Stenton, Frank (1971). Anglo-Saxon England (3rd ed.). Oxford, UK: Oxford University Press. ISBN 978-0-19-280139-5.
- Thacker, Alan (1988). "Æthelwold and Abingdon". In Yorke, Barbara (ed.). Bishop Æthelwold: His Career and Influence. Woodbridge, Suffolk: The Boydell Press. pp. 43–64. ISBN 978-0-85115-705-4.
- Wareham, Andrew (1996). "Saint Oswald's Family and Kin". In Brooks, Nicholas; Cubitt, Catherine (eds.). St Oswald of Worcester: Life and Influence. London, UK: Leicester University Press. pp. 46–63. ISBN 978-0-7185-0003-0.
- Whalley, Thomas Sedgwick (1779). Edwy and Edilda: a Tale in Five Parts. London, UK: J. Dodsley. OCLC 1063203838.
- Whitelock, Dorothy, ed. (1930). Anglo-Saxon Wills. Cambridge, UK: Cambridge University Press. OCLC 786120891.
- Whitelock, Dorothy, ed. (1979). English Historical Documents, Volume 1, c. 500–1042 (2nd ed.). London, UK: Routledge. ISBN 978-0-415-14366-0.
- Wickham, Chris (2009). "Problems in doing Comparative History". In Skinner, Patricia (ed.). Challenging the Boundaries of Medieval History: The Legacy of Timothy Reuter. Turnhout, Belgium: Brepols. pp. 5–28. ISBN 978-2-503-52359-0.
- Williams, Ann (1982). "Princeps Merciorum Gentis:the Family, Career and Connections of Ælfhere, Ealdorman of Mercia". Anglo-Saxon England. 10: 143–172. doi:10.1017/S0263675100003240. ISSN 0263-6751.
- Williams, Ann (1999). Kingship and Government in Pre-Conquest England, c. 500–1066. Basingstoke, Hampshire: Macmillan Press Ltd. ISBN 978-0-312-22090-7.
- Williams, Ann (2003). Æthelred the Unready: The Ill-Counselled King. London, UK: Hambledon and London. ISBN 978-1-85285-382-2.
- Williams, Ann (2004a). "Edmund I (920/21–946)". Oxford Dictionary of National Biography. Oxford University Press. doi:10.1093/ref:odnb/8501. ISBN 978-0-19-861412-8. (subscription, Wikipedia Library access or UK public library membership required)
- Williams, Ann (2004b). "Eadred [Edred] (d. 955)". Oxford Dictionary of National Biography. Oxford University Press. doi:10.1093/ref:odnb/8510. ISBN 978-0-19-861412-8. (subscription, Wikipedia Library access or UK public library membership required)
- Williams, Ann (2004c). "Ælfhere (d. 983)". Oxford Dictionary of National Biography. Oxford University Press. doi:10.1093/ref:odnb/182. ISBN 978-0-19-861412-8. (subscription, Wikipedia Library access or UK public library membership required)
- Williams, Ann (2014). "Edgar [called Edgar Pacificus] (943/4–975)". Oxford Dictionary of National Biography. Oxford University Press. doi:10.1093/ref:odnb/8463. ISBN 978-0-19-861412-8. (subscription, Wikipedia Library access or UK public library membership required)
- Winterbottom, Michael; Lapidge, Michael, eds. (2011). The Early Lives of St Dunstan (in Latin and English). Oxford, UK: Oxford University Press. ISBN 978-0-19-960504-0.
- Wood, Michael (1999). In Search of England. London, UK: Penguin. ISBN 978-0-14-024733-6.
- Yorke, Barbara (1988). "Æthelwold and the Politics of the Tenth Century". In Yorke, Barbara (ed.). Bishop Æthelwold: His Career and Influence. Woodbridge, Suffolk: The Boydell Press. pp. 65–88. ISBN 978-0-85115-705-4.
- Yorke, Barbara (1995). Wessex in the Early Middle Ages. London, UK: Leicester University Press. ISBN 978-0-7185-1856-1.
- Yorke, Barbara (2004). "Ælfsige (d. 959)". Oxford Dictionary of National Biography. Oxford University Press. doi:10.1093/ref:odnb/192. ISBN 978-0-19-861412-8. (subscription, Wikipedia Library access or UK public library membership required)
- Yorke, Barbara (2008). "The Women in Edgar's Life". In Scragg, Donald (ed.). Edgar King of the English, 595–975. Woodbridge, Suffolk: The Boydell Press. pp. 143–157. ISBN 978-1-84383-928-6.

Eadwig House of Wessex Born: c. 940 Died: 1 October 959
Regnal titles
Preceded by Eadred	King of the English; 955–959	Succeeded by Edgar
