= Sharon Turner =

English historian (1768–1847)

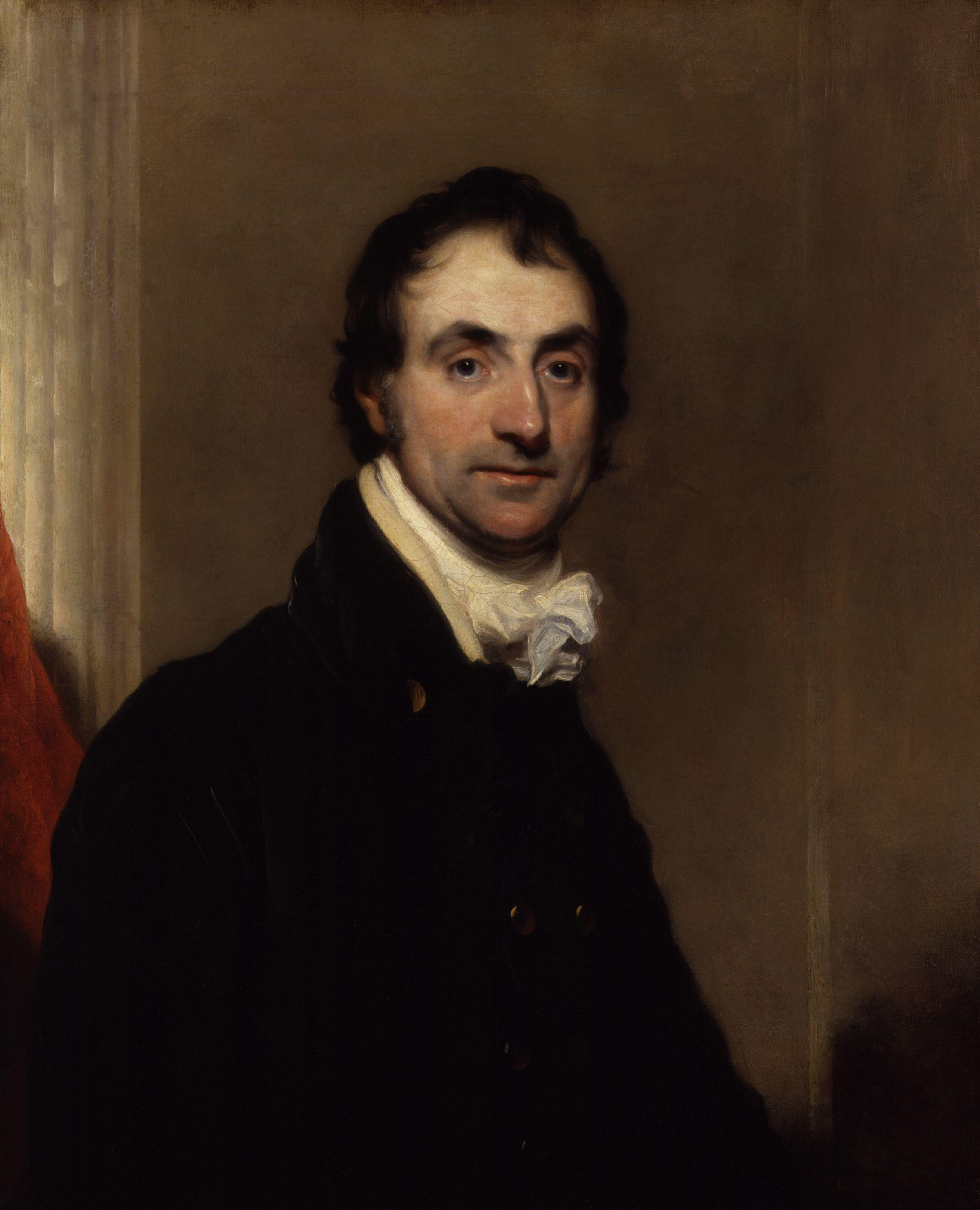
- Sharon Turner by Sir Martin Archer Shee
- Born: 24 September 1768; Pentonville, London
- Died: 13 February 1847 (aged 78); Red Lion Square, London
- Occupation: Historian
- Known for: Anglo-Saxon history

Sharon Turner (24 September 1768 – 13 February 1847) was an English historian.

== Life ==
Turner was born in Pentonville, the eldest son of William and Ann Turner of Yorkshire, who had settled in London upon marrying. He left school at fifteen to be articled to an attorney in the Temple. On 18 January 1795 he married Mary Watts (bap. 1768, died 1843), with whom he had at least six children. Among these were Sydney, inspector of reformatory schools, and Mary, married to the economist William Ellis.

Turner became a solicitor but left the profession after he became interested in the study of Icelandic and Anglo-Saxon literature. He settled himself in Red Lion Square near the British Museum, staying there for sixteen years. When his friend Isaac D'Israeli left the synagogue after a dispute with the rabbi, Turner persuaded him to have his children, including the future Prime Minister Benjamin Disraeli, baptised in the Church of England, to give them a better chance in life.

Some of his manuscripts were written almost illegibly in the margins of letters, on the inside covers of magazines, or on discarded wax paper. His publisher sent him clean paper but Turner did not use it.

== History of the Anglo-Saxons ==
Turner's History of the Anglo-Saxons appeared in four volumes between 1799 and 1805.

Britain at the time of original publication was involved in wars against France and the idea of the Norman yoke (Anglo-Saxon liberty versus Norman despotism) had been around since the seventeenth century. Turner demonstrated Anglo-Saxon liberty "in the shape of a good constitution, temperate kingship, the witenagemot, and general principles of freedom". Turner researched extensively the collections in the British Museum and the manuscripts of Sir Robert Cotton. In doing so he obtained a working knowledge of Old English.

The History had a profound impact on historiography for the succeeding fifty years. Robert Southey said that "so much new information was probably never laid before the public in any one historical publication". However, the Edinburgh Review in 1804 criticised Turner for a lack of discrimination and for the romantic parts of the work.

Sir Walter Scott acknowledged his debt to Turner for his historical work in his Dedicatory Epistle to his novel Ivanhoe. In 1981 J. W. Burrow said Turner produced "the first modern full-length history of Saxon England … It was a genuinely pioneering work, and was much admired, and not without reason".

He contributed articles on English history to Rees's Cyclopædia, but the titles are not known.

== Historical work ==
He continued the narrative in several subsequent works: History of England During the Middle Ages, a multi-volume publication covering English history from the reign of William the Conqueror to the accession of Henry VIII; History of the Reign of Henry VIII; and History of the Reigns of Edward VI, Mary, and Elizabeth. In 1839, the works were combined into The History of England, a twelve-volume set covering all of English history up to 1603.

Against the emergence of the French Consulate, Turner promoted the notion of Anglo-Saxon liberty as opposed to Norman tyranny (strong since the 17th century).

Turner also authored a Sacred History of the World, a translation of Beowulf and a poem on Richard III.

== Death and personal life ==
He was buried in a brick vault at West Norwood Cemetery. His son, Sydney Turner (1814–1879), was educated at Trinity College, Cambridge, took holy orders in the Church of England, and became rector of Hempsted. Sharon Turner's son-in-law was William Ellis (1800–1881), an educationalist and economist who tutored the British royal family.
