= The Throne of Saturn =

The Throne of Saturn may refer to:

- The Throne of Saturn (short story collection), a 1949 short story collection by S. Fowler Wright
- The Throne of Saturn (novel), a 1970 science fiction novel by Pulitzer Prize-winning political fiction author Allen Drury
