= Deluge (novel) =

1928 novel by S. Fowler Wright

- First commercial edition
- Author: S. Fowler Wright
- Language: English
- Genre: Apocalyptic and post-apocalyptic fiction
- Publisher: Cosmopolitan Book Corporation
- Publication date: 1928
- Publication place: United Kingdom
- Media type: Print (hard & paperback)
- Pages: 395 pp
- Followed by: Dawn

Deluge: A Romance is a 1928 post-apocalyptic novel by British author S. Fowler Wright.

In the novel, a series of tremors creates a global flood that destroys all civilization save for a few areas of the English Midlands that remain above water. It follows Martin Webster, a lawyer who loses his wife and children. His companion, Claire Arlington, is an athlete and one of the few women to survive the flood. Their love affair is complicated when Helen, Martin's wife, turns out not to be dead after all. It is one of the earliest examples of apocalyptic fiction; it is also classified as a scientific romance.

Wright used the metaphor of the flood and the aftermath to comment critically upon 1920s British society at the time. A film version made in Hollywood, very loosely based upon the book but instead set in New York City, was released in 1933. The film was well received in the United States and granted Wright considerable financial success.

Deluge was Wright's first bestseller both in the United States and in Wright's native United Kingdom, the success of the novel allowed Wright to pursue writing full-time

== Background ==
Wright composed Deluge while working as an accountant. Unable to sell his story to a commercial publisher, Wright opted to self-publish Deluge after noting the positive reception garnered from his previous novel, The Amphibians. Previously, Wright had focused on writing poetry, helping to found the Empire Poetry League. Prior to Deluge, Wright had little experience in writing science fiction novels, though Wright was always known to have an interest in the genre.

== Reception ==
Deluge became a bestseller upon release. There were very few copies in circulation initially, as Wright had produced a limited amount through his personal publishing house. However, the positive reception received by Deluge attracted the attention of Cosmopolitan Book Corporation, which allowed for mass production of the novel. Deluge was Wright's first popular novel and granted him considerable financial success. Storm Jameson praised Deluge on its original publication in the magazine London Calling, comparing Deluge to Cicely Hamilton's post-holocaust novel Theodore Savage. Edward Shanks, reviewing Deluge in the London Mercury, also lauded the book. Clemence Dane, discussing Deluge in the women's magazine Eve: The Lady's Pictorial, praised Deluge and compared it to After London by Richard Jefferies. Not all reception was positive, as Wright noted in a following edition of Deluge. Certain reviewers suggested Wright was "full of prejudices" in his writing. Others criticized Wright for his one dimensional female character development. However, most considered the book to be a brilliant work of science fiction.

A sequel to Deluge, Dawn, was completed in 1929, though it was not as well received.

== Themes ==
Deluge criticizes contemporary civilization and class systems. In the novel, modern civilization is dissolved, and Deluge depicts this new, less advanced society as noble, admirable, and natural rather than savage, contending futuristic comforts are unrealistic and ultimately inherently corrupt societal goals. This theme was an argument against many science fiction authors at the time, as writers like H.G. Wells suggested scientific advancement was positive and ultimately a necessity. The book also suggests humans cooperate better in a more simplified society.

== Influence ==
Deluge was of great inspiration to future science fiction writers John Wyndham and John Christopher. Deluge influenced Storm Jameson's novel of a Britain devastated by floods, The World Ends (1937, using the pseudonym William Lamb).
