= The World Below =

1929 novel by S. Fowler Wright

- First edition (UK)
- Author: S. Fowler Wright
- Language: English
- Genre: Science fiction
- Publisher: Collins (UK); Longman (US)
- Publication date: 1929 (UK); 1930 (US)
- Publication place: United Kingdom
- Media type: Print (Hardback)
- Pages: 344
- OCLC: 6574474

The World Below is a science fiction novel by British writer S. Fowler Wright. It was first published in 1929 by Collins. The novel was originally intended as a trilogy, but the third part was never written. The first part was originally published separately as The Amphibians by Merton Press in 1924. The second part was published separately by Galaxy Science Fiction Novels in 1951 and was also titled The World Below.

== Plot summary ==
The novel concerns a man who travels 500,000 years into the future with the aid of a time machine. There he encounters a race of intelligent furry beings, the Amphibians. With their help he explores the planet and is eventually captured by the Dwellers, intelligent giants who direct the destiny of the continent where he had arrived.

== Critical reception ==
Boucher and McComas praised the 1949 edition, citing its "sociological criticism, spiritual stimulation and satire of high order." In 1950 L. Sprague de Camp characterized it as "one of the most remarkable science-fiction stories ever written," saying that "For atmosphere the book is absolutely unsurpassed, and for exciting action it rates high." de Camp, however, also faulted the novel's "long philosophical arguments" in dialogue between its hero and his non-human companion, particularly their "straw-man" elements.

== Sources ==
- Chalker, Jack L.; Mark Owings (1998). The Science-Fantasy Publishers: A Bibliographic History, 1923-1998. Westminster, MD and Baltimore: Mirage Press, Ltd. p. 593.
- Crawford, Jr., Joseph H.; James J. Donahue; Donald M. Grant (1953). "333", A Bibliography of the Science-Fantasy Novel. Providence, RI: The Grandon Company. p. 72. OCLC 3924496.
- Tuck, Donald H. (1978). The Encyclopedia of Science Fiction and Fantasy. Chicago: Advent. p. 470. ISBN 0-911682-22-8.
