= Æthelred, Lord of the Mercians =

9th and 10th-century ruler of Mercia in England

Æthelred
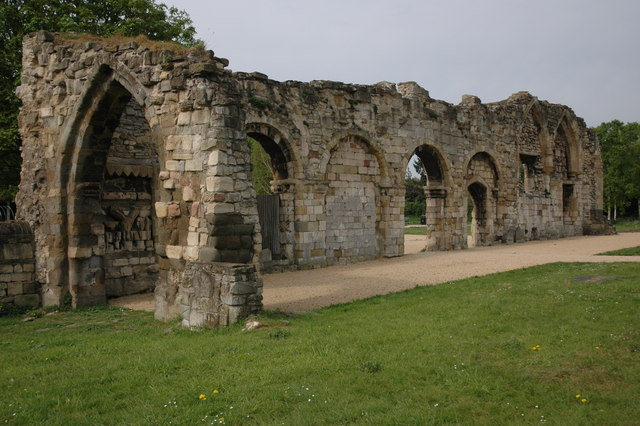
- Ruins of St Oswald's Priory, Gloucester, where Æthelred and Æthelflæd were buried

Lord of the Mercians
- Reign: c. 881–911
- Predecessor: Ceolwulf II (as King of Mercia)
- Successor: Æthelflæd (as Lady of the Mercians)
- Died: 911 AD
- Burial: St Oswald's Priory, Gloucester
- Spouse: Æthelflæd
- Issue: Ælfwynn

Æthelred (died 911) became Lord of the Mercians in England shortly after the death or disappearance of Mercia's last king, Ceolwulf II, in 879. He is also sometimes called the Ealdorman of Mercia. Æthelred's rule was confined to the western half, as eastern Mercia was then part of the Viking-ruled Danelaw. His ancestry is unknown. He was probably the leader of an unsuccessful Mercian invasion of Wales in 881, and soon afterwards he acknowledged the lordship of King Alfred the Great of Wessex. This alliance was cemented by the marriage of Æthelred to Alfred's daughter Æthelflæd.

In 886, Alfred took possession of London, which had suffered greatly from several Viking occupations. Alfred then handed London over to Æthelred, as it had traditionally been a Mercian town. In 892, the Vikings renewed their attacks, and the following year, Æthelred led an army of Mercians, West Saxons and Welsh to victory over a Viking army at the Battle of Buttington. He spent the next three years fighting them alongside Alfred's son, the future King Edward the Elder. At some time after 899 Æthelred's health may have declined, and Æthelflæd may have become the effective ruler of Mercia.

After Æthelred's death, Æthelflæd ruled as Lady of the Mercians until her own death in 918. The couple's only child, a daughter called Ælfwynn, then ruled briefly until deposed by her uncle, King Edward.

== Background ==
England in the time of Æthelred

Mercia was the dominant kingdom in southern England in the eighth century, and maintained its position until it suffered a decisive defeat by King Ecgberht of Wessex at the Battle of Ellendun in 825. Ecgberht briefly conquered Mercia, but it recovered its independence in 830, and thereafter the two kingdoms became allies, which was to be an important factor in English resistance to the Vikings. The Mercians traditionally held overlordship over Wales, and in 853, King Burgred of Mercia obtained the assistance of King Æthelwulf of Wessex in an invasion of Wales in order to reassert their hegemony. The same year, Burgred married Æthelwulf's daughter.

In 865, the Viking Great Heathen Army landed in East Anglia, and used it as a starting point for an invasion. The East Anglians were forced to buy peace, and the following year, the Vikings invaded Northumbria, where they established an obscure Northumbrian man called Ecgberht as a puppet king in 867. They then moved on to Nottingham in Mercia, where they spent the winter of 867–868. Burgred was joined by King Æthelred of Wessex and his brother, the future King Alfred, for a combined attack on the Vikings, but they refused an engagement and in the end the Mercians bought peace with them. The following year, the Vikings conquered East Anglia. They returned to Mercia in 872; two years later they expelled Burgred, and Ceolwulf II became king with their support. Ceolwulf was described by the Anglo-Saxon Chronicle as "a foolish king's thegn" who was a puppet of the Vikings, but historians regard this view as partial and distorted: he was accepted as a true king by the Mercians and by King Alfred.

In 877, the Vikings divided Mercia, taking the eastern part for themselves and leaving Ceolwulf with the west. The Vikings went on to attack Wessex, leaving Ceolwulf free to renew Mercian claims of hegemony in Wales. At almost the same time as Alfred's victory over the Vikings in 878 at the Battle of Edington, Ceolwulf defeated and killed Rhodri Mawr, king of the north Welsh territory of Gwynedd. After Ceolwulf's disappearance in 879, Mercia began to fall under the hegemony of Wessex.

== Life ==
=== Early rule ===
Æthelred's descent is unknown, and he does not appear to have been closely related to his immediate predecessors, although his name suggests possible descent from earlier Mercian kings. He may have been the man of the same name who attested two Mercian charters in the late 860s, but he is not listed in the two surviving charters of Ceolwulf. Lists of witnesses to charters show that Æthelred's witan (council) shared bishops and at least two ealdormen with Ceolwulf, but Ceolwulf's thegns all disappeared. In the view of Ian Walker: "He was a royal ealdorman whose power base lay in the south-west of Mercia in the former kingdom of the Hwicce around Gloucester." However, Alex Woolf suggests that he was probably the son of King Burgred of Mercia and Æthelswith, sister of Alfred the Great, although that would mean that Æthelred's marriage was uncanonical, as Rome then forbade marriage between first cousins.

It is not known when Æthelred took over following Ceolwulf's death or disappearance, but in the view of Thomas Charles-Edwards, a historian of medieval Wales, Æthelred was almost certainly "Edryd Long-Hair", the leader of a Mercian army which invaded Gwynedd in 881, and was defeated by Rhodri Mawr's sons at the Battle of the Conwy. This was described by Welsh annals as "revenge by God for Rhodri". The defeat forced Æthelred to abandon his ambitions in north Wales, but he continued to exercise overlordship over the south-eastern Welsh kingdoms of Glywysing and Gwent. According to Alfred's Welsh biographer Asser, Æthelred's "might and tyrannical behaviour" forced these kingdoms to submit to the protection of King Alfred's lordship. By 883, Æthelred had accepted Alfred's lordship. Charles-Edwards suggests that in 881–882 he tried to maintain his dominance in south-east Wales, but Alfred offered his protection to Glywysing and Gwent, and in 882–883, Æthelred accepted that West Saxon power made continued independence impossible. Charles-Edwards comments:

The implication of all this is that the Mercian submission to Alfred – a crucial step in the creation of a single English kingdom – occurred not just because of one battle, Alfred's victory over the Great Army at Edington in 878, but also because of another, more distant battle, "God's revenge" on the Mercians at the Conwy, when Anarawd of Gwynedd and his brothers defeated Æthelred and so brought about that collapse of the Mercian hegemony in Wales from which Alfred was only too pleased to benefit.

When Æthelred made a grant to Berkeley Abbey in 883, he did it with the approval of King Alfred, thus acknowledging Alfred's lordship. Thereafter he usually acted with Alfred's permission, but issued some charters in his own name without reference to Alfred, such as at a meeting in Risborough in Buckinghamshire in 884, showing that English Mercia extended quite far south-east towards London.

After the Battle of Edington in 878, Alfred established a network of fortified settlements, called burhs, in Wessex to protect his people and territory against Viking attacks, and when Æthelred accepted Alfred's lordship the burhs were extended into Mercia. One of the burhs was Worcester, where Æthelred worked with its bishop and used the standing Roman walls in the town's defences. Over the next two generations Worcester was transformed from an ecclesiastical settlement to a town with a diverse population of craftsmen.

London suffered severely from Viking attacks and was several times occupied by Viking armies. In 886, Alfred took possession of London, and according to Asser he "restored" the city and "made it habitable again". He then handed control to Æthelred. Historians, however, disagree about the circumstances. According to Frank Stenton, Alfred recovered London by force from the Vikings and handed it to Æthelred because it had previously been a Mercian town, and he respected the traditions of other kingdoms. Marios Costambeys takes a similar view, arguing that Alfred's decision was probably due to the need to maintain unity among the English who were outside Viking territory. Alfred Smyth suggests that the Chronicle's account reflects bias in Alfred's favour, and that Æthelred took charge because he had a greater role in London's recovery than the West Saxon chronicler was willing to admit. Some versions of the Chronicle state that Alfred besieged London in 883, and Simon Keynes argues that Alfred probably took London at that time and that the "occupation" in 886 may have been a restoration of London's defences following Viking attacks close to the city in 885.

Anglo-Saxon London, called Lundenwic, was located a mile west of Roman Londinium, but Lundenwic was undefended, and the restoration was carried out inside the walls of the old Roman city, especially an area close to the River Thames now called Queenhithe, but which was then known as Æthelred's Hythe after its Mercian ruler. Æthelred moved quickly to restore the area; in 889, he and Alfred granted property there to the Bishop of Worcester, and in 899, they made another grant to the Archbishop of Canterbury. Both bishops were, like Æthelred, Mercians and strong allies of King Alfred, who had the right to all tolls from markets along the river bank.

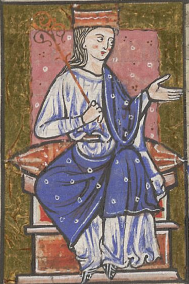
Æthelflæd as depicted in the thirteenth-century cartulary of Abingdon Abbey

After the restoration of London, Alfred received the submission of "all the English people who were not under subjection to the Danes", and the alliance between Wessex and Mercia was cemented by the marriage of Æthelred to Alfred's oldest daughter, Æthelflæd. She is first recorded as Æthelred's wife in a charter of 887, but the marriage probably took place in the early to mid 880s. Æthelred was probably much older than his wife. They had a daughter, Ælfwynn, and according to the twelfth century chronicler, William of Malmesbury, she was their only child. In King Alfred's will, drawn up in the 880s, Æthelred was left a sword worth 100 mancuses.

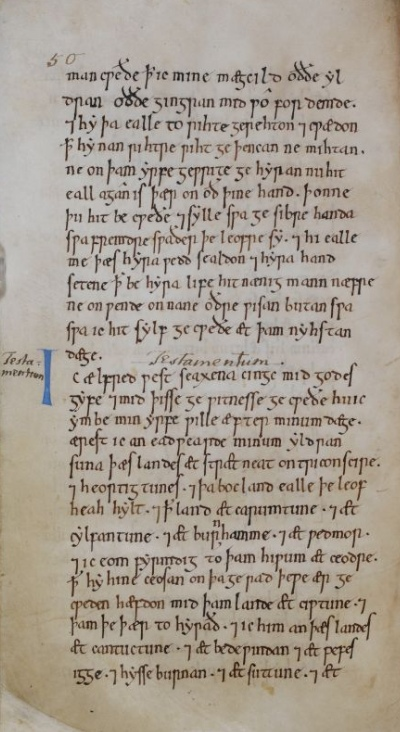
Page of the will of Alfred the Great, c. 883, mentions Æthelred (copy dated c. 1031, British Library Stowe MS 944, ff. 29v–33r)

In 892, two Viking armies attacked eastern England, and Æthelred took part in the defence. After the defeat of one Viking leader, Hastein, Alfred became godfather to one of Hastein's two sons and Æthelred to the other. Soon afterwards, the English captured Hastein's wife and children, but they were returned to him because the sons were godsons of the English leaders. In 893, Æthelred brought troops from London to join Alfred's son Edward against a Viking army at Thorney in Buckinghamshire, but the Vikings were too strong for a direct attack so they were allowed to leave English territory. Later in the year, a larger Viking force marched from Essex through Mercia to the Welsh border, followed by Æthelred with a joint force of Mercians and West Saxons. Welsh kings joined Æthelred to meet the Vikings at the Battle of Buttington, where according to Smyth "these invaders were utterly routed ... in what was the most decisive battle in the war", although Marios Costambeys states that the Vikings eventually cut their way out and retreated to Essex. The Viking army finally dispersed in 896. For much of the time, Alfred had been in the west country defending Devonshire, and in the view of Richard Abels: "King Alfred had little to do directly with the great victories enjoyed by the English in 893–896. His son, Edward, and his ealdormen, in particular his son-in-law, Æthelred, had won the glory."

In the last years of the ninth century, three ealdormen ruled Mercia under Æthelred. Æthelflæd's maternal uncle, Æthelwulf, controlled western and possibly central Mercia, while the south and east were ruled by Æthelfrith, the father of Æthelstan Half-King. Alhhelm was responsible for the lands bordering the northern Danelaw. Æthelwulf and Alhhelm are not recorded after the turn of the century, and Æthelfrith may have been Æthelflæd's chief lieutenant when Æthelred's health collapsed soon afterwards. Æthelfrith may have been of West Saxon origin, appointed by Alfred to look after his interests in south-east Mercia.

Evidence from charters shows that Æthelred and Æthelflæd supported religious communities. In 883, Æthelred freed Berkeley Abbey from obligations to the king's feorm (payments in kind), and in 887 he confirmed (with Æthelflæd also attesting) the possession of land and transferred manpower to Pyrton Minster in Oxfordshire. In 901, they jointly gave land to Much Wenlock Abbey, and donated a gold chalice weighing thirty mancuses in honour of its former abbess, Saint Mildburgh. (Note: Charters S 218, 217, and 221.) In 903, they negotiated a settlement over a former monastic estate which the bishops of Worcester had been trying to recover since the 840s, and Bishop Wærferth wrote "we never could get anywhere until Æthelred became Lord of the Mercians".

=== Later life ===
Some historians believe that at an unknown time in the decade 899 to 909, Æthelred's health collapsed and Æthelflæd became the effective ruler of Mercia. Cyril Hart and Maggie Bailey believe that it occurred by 902. Bailey cites "Mercian Register" (Note: The "Mercian Register" (also known as the "Annals of Æthelflæd") is the name given by historians to entries from 902 to 924 in several versions of the Anglo-Saxon Chronicle which report events from a Mercian point of view, counteracting the West Saxon bias of the "Main Chronicle".) entries from 902 showing Æthelflæd acting alone or in conjunction with Edward in military operations. Irish annals called the Three Fragments also suggest that Æthelred was unable to take an active part in government from about 902, although he did attend a meeting in 903 with King Edward, Æthelflæd and Ælfwynn. In 1998, Keynes suggested that Æthelred may have been incapacitated by illness at the end of his life, but in a summary of his career in 2014, Keynes does not mention this, stating that Æthelred and Æthelflæd cooperated with King Edward in campaigns against the Vikings. Martin Ryan also makes no mention of a decline in Æthelred's health, describing him as joining Edward in encouraging thegns to purchase land in Viking territories.

According to William of Malmesbury, King Edward's eldest son, the future King Æthelstan, was sent to be brought up at the court of Æthelred and Æthelflæd after Edward remarried in about 900. This is supported by one independent piece of evidence. According to a transcript dating from 1304 in York's archives, in 925, Æthelstan gave a grant of privileges to St Oswald's Priory in Gloucester "according to a pact of paternal piety which formerly he pledged with Æthelred, ealdorman of the people of the Mercians". When King Edward died in 924, Æthelstan initially faced opposition at the West Saxon court, but was accepted as king in Mercia.

After Æthelred's death in 911, Æthelflæd ruled as "Lady of the Mercians", but she did not inherit the Mercian territories of London and Oxford, which were taken by Edward. Æthelflæd died in 918, and their daughter Ælfwynn briefly ruled Mercia until deposed by Edward the Elder, who took the territory under his direct control.

=== St Oswald's Priory, Gloucester ===
Gloucester seems to have been the main seat of Æthelred's and Æthelflæd's power, and before 900 they founded a new minster there, dedicated to St Peter. In 909, a West Saxon and Mercian army raided Viking territory and seized the bones of the Northumbrian king and martyr, St Oswald, from Bardney in Lincolnshire. The bones were translated to the new Gloucester minster, which was renamed St Oswald's Priory in his honour. The acquisition of the relics raised the prestige of the new minster and increased its wealth by making it a focus for pilgrims. The historian Martin Ryan sees the new minster as something like a Mercian royal mausoleum, to replace the one at Repton destroyed by the Vikings, and Æthelred and Æthelflæd were buried there.

== Status ==
Æthelred's status is disputed, and this is reflected in the varying titles given to him by different historians. He is sometimes called "ealdorman", but also "Lord of the Mercians" and "subking". Coinage issued in English Mercia in Ceolred's time named him as king, but in Æthelred's time it named the West Saxon king, yet Æthelred issued some charters in his own name, implying royal authority. West Saxon sources refer to him as an ealdorman, emphasising Mercian subordination to the West Saxon monarchy, whereas Mercian ones describe him as Lord of the Mercians, and Celtic ones sometimes as King of Mercia. The late tenth-century chronicler Æthelweard, in his annal for 893, called Æthelred "King of the Mercians", but recorded his death in 911 as that of the "Lord of the Mercians".

King Edward's influence over Mercia is unclear, and he may have had less power than his father. Edward's charters show Æthelred and Æthelflæd as accepting his royal authority, but their own charters make no reference to an overlord, and some use expressions such as "holding, governing and defending the sole rule of the Mercians", which come close to describing them as king and queen.

Pauline Stafford comments that "Alfred's dominance in the 890s over Æthelred, Lord of the Mercians, was as debatable at the time as it still is." In the view of Ann Williams, "though he accepted West Saxon overlordship, Æthelred behaved rather as a king of Mercia than an ealdorman", and Charles Insley states that Mercia remained an independent kingdom until 920. To the Welsh and Irish looking east, Mercian rulers still kept all their old regality until Æthelflæd's death in 918, and Nick Higham argues that: "Celtic visions of Æthelred and Æthelflæd as king and queen certainly offer a different, and equally valid, contemporary take on the complex politics of this transition to a new English state."

In the Handbook of British Chronology David Dumville lists Æthelred as King Æthelred II, and thus a successor to the seventh century King Æthelred of Mercia. Keynes takes the West Saxon view, arguing that Alfred created the "kingdom of the Anglo-Saxons", inherited by his son Edward the Elder in 899, and Æthelred ruled Mercia under the king. However, Keynes also says:

Æthelred usually acted with the permission of or in association with King Alfred, but occasionally he acted independently of him. Although sometimes described as plain dux or ealdorman, his status was clearly quite different from that of other duces, for he is also accorded styles which aspire to divine grace and which appear to verge on the royal. In other words, there is no mistaking that the Mercians retained a conception of their ruler as a rightful successor to earlier kings, and a conception of their land as a kingdom with its own identity; but there is also no mistaking that Æthelred moved in an Alfredian world.

== Sources ==
- Abels, Richard (1998). Alfred the Great: War, Kingship and Culture in Anglo-Saxon England. Longman. ISBN 0-582-04047-7.
- Bailey, Maggie (2001). "Ælfwynn, Second Lady of the Mercians". In Higham, N. J.; Hill, D. H. (eds.). Edward the Elder 899–924. Routledge. ISBN 0-415-21497-1.
- Baxter, Stephen (2007). The Earls of Mercia. Oxford University Press. ISBN 978-0-19-923098-3.
- Bintley, M. (2014). "The translation of St Oswald's relics to New Minster, Gloucester: royal and imperial resonances" (PDF). Anglo-Saxon Studies in Archaeology and History. 19: 171–81. ISSN 0264-5254.
- Blair, John (2005). The Church in Anglo-Saxon Society. Oxford University Press. ISBN 978-0-19-921117-3.
- Charles-Edwards, Thomas (1998). "Alliances, Godfathers, Treaties and Boundaries". In Blackburn, M. A. S.; Dumville, D. N. (eds.). Kings, Currency and Alliances: History and Coinage of Southern England in the Ninth Century. Boydell Press. ISBN 0-85115-598-7.
- Charles-Edwards, Thomas (2013). Wales and the Britons 350–1064. Oxford University Press. ISBN 978-0-19-821731-2.
- Costambeys, Marios (2004a). "Æthelflæd (Ethelfleda) (d. 918), ruler of the Mercians". Oxford Dictionary of National Biography. Oxford University Press. doi:10.1093/ref:odnb/8907. ISBN 978-0-19-861412-8. (subscription, Wikipedia Library access or UK public library membership required)
- Costambeys, Marios (2004b). "Æthelred (d. 911), ruler of the Mercians". Oxford Dictionary of National Biography. Oxford University Press. doi:10.1093/ref:odnb/52311. (subscription, Wikipedia Library access or UK public library membership required)
- Dumville, David (1996). "Kings of Mercia". In Fryde, E. B.; Greenway, D. E.; Porter, S.; Roy, I. (eds.). Handbook of British Chronology (3rd ed.). Royal Historical Society. pp. 15–18. ISBN 0-521-56350-X.
- Fleming, Robin (2011). Britain after Rome: The Fall and the Rise, 400 to 1070. Penguin Books. ISBN 978-0-14-014823-7.
- Foot, Sarah (2011). Æthelstan: the first king of England. Yale University Press. ISBN 978-0-300-12535-1.
- Hart, Cyril (1992). The Danelaw. London, UK: The Hambledon Press. ISBN 978-1-85285-044-9.
- Heighway, Carolyn (2001). "Gloucester and the new minster of St Oswald". In Higham, N. J.; Hill, D. H. (eds.). Edward the Elder 899–924. Routledge. ISBN 0-415-21497-1.
- Higham, Nick (2001). "Endpiece". In Higham, N. J.; Hill, D. H. (eds.). Edward the Elder 899–924. Routledge. ISBN 0-415-21497-1.
- Insley, Charles (2013). "Southumbria". In Stafford, Pauline (ed.). A Companion to the Early Middle Ages: Britain and Ireland c. 500-c. 1100. Wiley-Blackwell. ISBN 978-1-118-42513-8.
- Keynes, Simon; Lapidge, Michael, eds. (1983). Alfred the Great: Asser's Life of King Alfred & Other Contemporary Sources. Penguin Classics. ISBN 978-0-14-044409-4.
- Keynes, Simon (1998). "King Alfred and the Mercians". In Blackburn, M. A. S.; Dumville, D. N. (eds.). Kings, Currency and Alliances: History and Coinage of Southern England in the Ninth Century. Boydell Press. ISBN 0-85115-598-7.
- Keynes, Simon (1999). "England, c. 900–1016". In Reuter, Timothy (ed.). The New Cambridge Medieval History. Vol. III. Cambridge University Press. pp. 456–484. ISBN 0-521-36447-7.
- Keynes, Simon (2001). "Edward, King of the Anglo-Saxons". In Higham, N. J.; Hill, D. H. (eds.). Edward the Elder 899–924. Routledge. ISBN 978-0-470-65632-7.
- Keynes, Simon (2014). "Æthelred 'Lord of the Mercians' (d. 911)". In Lapidge, Michael; Blair, John; Keynes, Simon; Scragg, Donald (eds.). The Wiley Blackwell Encyclopaedia of Anglo-Saxon England (2nd ed.). Wiley Blackwell. p. 16. ISBN 978-0-631-22492-1.
- Lyon, Stewart (2001). "The Coinage of Edward the Elder". In Higham, N. J.; Hill, D. H. (eds.). Edward the Elder 899–924. Routledge. ISBN 0-415-21497-1.
- Miller, Sean (2004). "Ceolwulf II (fl. 874–879)". Oxford Dictionary of National Biography. Oxford University Press. doi:10.1093/ref:odnb/39145. ISBN 978-0-19-861412-8. (subscription, Wikipedia Library access or UK public library membership required)
- Ryan, Martin J. (2013). "Conquest, Reform and the Making of England". In Higham, Nicholas J.; Ryan, Martin J. (eds.). The Anglo-Saxon World. Yale University Press. ISBN 978-0-300-12534-4.
- Smyth, Alfred (1987). Scandinavian York and Dublin. Vol. 1. Irish Academic Press. ISBN 0-7165-2365-5.
- Smyth, Alfred (1995). King Alfred the Great. Oxford University Press. ISBN 0-19-822989-5.
- Stafford, Pauline (2007). "'The Annals of Æthelflæd': Annals, History and Politics in Early Tenth-Century England". In Barrow, Julia; Wareham, Andrew (eds.). Myth, Rulership, Church and Charters. Ashgate. ISBN 978-0-7546-5120-8.
- Stenton, Frank M. (1971). Anglo-Saxon England (3rd ed.). Clarendon Press. ISBN 978-0-19-280139-5.
- Wainwright, F. T. (1975). Scandinavian England: Collected Papers. Phillimore. ISBN 0-900592-65-6.
- Walker, Ian W. (2000). Mercia and the Making of England. Sutton Publishing. ISBN 0-7509-2131-5.
- Williams, Ann (1991a). "Æthelred Lord of the Mercians c. 883–911". In Williams, Ann; Smyth, Alfred P.; Kirby, D. P. (eds.). A Biographical Dictionary of Dark Age Britain. Seaby. p. 27. ISBN 978-1-85264-047-7.
- Williams, Ann (1991b). "Ceolwulf II, King of Mercia 874–9". In Williams, Ann; Smyth, Alfred P.; Kirby, D. P. (eds.). A Biographical Dictionary of Dark Age Britain. Seaby. p. 77. ISBN 978-1-85264-047-7.
- Woolf, Alex (2001). "View from the West: an Irish Perspective". In Higham, N. J.; Hill, D. H. (eds.). Edward the Elder 899–924. Routledge. ISBN 0-415-21497-1.
- Yorke, Barbara (1990). Kings and Kingdoms of Early Anglo-Saxon England. Seaby. ISBN 1-85264-027-8.

Æthelred, Lord of the Mercians
Regnal titles
Preceded by Ceolwulf II; King of Mercia	Lord of the Mercians c. 882–911	Succeeded by Æthelflæd; Lady of the Mercians
