= Mary Adella Wolcott =

Jamaican poet

- Born: November 13, 1879; Saint Mary Parish
- Occupation: Poet

Mary Adella Wolcott (November 13, 1879 – ?) was a Jamaican poet who wrote under the pen name Tropica.

Mary Adella Wolcott was born on November 13, 1879 in St. Mary's, Jamaica, the daughter of white American missionaries Henry Berdin Wolcott and Sarah Boardman Paddock. Her grandfather, a white American Baptist missionary named Seth Taylor Wolcott, purchased an estate named Richmond in Saint Mary Parish and created a small manual labor school for blacks. Her father had been disinterested in Richmond and in 1941 she unsuccessfully attempted to engage the Jamaican government in creating "an industrial school, a baby Tuskegee".

Wolcott attended Oberlin Academy in Oberlin, Ohio from 1896 to 1898 and graduated from the Drexel Institute Library School in 1908.

Wolcott published a single volume of poetry, The Island of Sunshine. Her work romanticizes plantation-era Jamaica from an ethnographic and colonial perspective. Her "Nana" is an elegy for a black nanny and her disappearing cultural traditions, while "Busha's Song" frames an overseer as the pastor of the plantation. Her work was later anthologized by J. E. Clare McFarlane.

In 1923, Wolcott was a founder of the Jamaica Poetry League, an offshoot of the Empire Poetry League.

== Bibliography ==
- The Island of Sunshine, New York, Knickerbocker Press, c. 1904
