= Æthelfrith of Mercia =

Ealdorman of southern Mercia

Æthelfrith (/ˈæθəlfrɪθ/; died c. 904/915) was an ealdorman of southern Mercia, who flourished in the last two decades of the ninth century and the first decade of the tenth century. His father is unknown. He was married to Æthelgyth, daughter of Æthelwulf; Æthelwulf is unidentified, but a possible candidate is King Alfred the Great's brother-in-law, the ealdorman of the Gaini who died in 901. Æthelfrith was father to four ealdormen: Æthelstan Half-King (East Anglia), Ælfstan (Mercia), Æthelwald (Kent), and Eadric (Wessex).

"In 903 it happened to Æthelfrith, dux, that all his deeds of title perished in the destruction of a fire. Therefore impelled by such a necessity, the aforementioned dux asked King Edward, also Æthelred and Æthelflæd, who then held rulership and power over the Mercian people under the aforementioned king, also all the members of the witan, that they should permit him and give authorisation for the rewriting of replacement charters for him." Among the charters reissued was one "concerning that land of ten hides, namely at Islington, which Coenwulf, the celebrated king of the Mercians, gave to his faithful comes, Beornnoth, to be free for himself and for his heirs in perpetuity after him". It would appear therefore that Æthelfrith, or possibly his wife, was descended from the old Mercian aristocracy.
