= Deluge (film) =

1933 film by Felix E. Feist

- Theatrical release poster
- Directed by: Felix E. Feist
- Written by: Warren B. Duff; John F. Goodrich
- Based on: Deluge by S. Fowler Wright
- Produced by: Sam Bischoff
- Starring: Peggy Shannon; Sidney Blackmer; Lois Wilson; Matt Moore; Fred Kohler
- Cinematography: Norbert Brodine
- Edited by: Martin G. Cohn; Rose Loewinger
- Music by: Val Burton
- Production company: Admiral Productions
- Distributed by: RKO Radio Pictures
- Release date: August 13, 1933
- Running time: 70 minutes
- Country: United States
- Language: English
- Budget: $171,000

Deluge is a 1933 American post-apocalyptic disaster film, directed by Felix E. Feist, and released by RKO Radio Pictures.

The film is very loosely based on the 1928 novel of the same name by S. Fowler Wright, with the setting changed from the United Kingdom to the United States. It follows a small group of survivors after a series of unexplained natural disasters erupt around the world and destroy civilization, including a massive tsunami which inundates New York City.

== Plot ==
Scientists discover that a violent storm is heading toward New York City and begin the warning process throughout the city. They believe that something is wrong with the natural barometric patterns and that an unprecedented event is imminent. A sudden eclipse of the sun verifies their speculations, and it seems that global destruction is near. Telegraph messages from Rome and London explain days of unending earthquakes and state "The End of the World is at Hand." Tremendous earthquakes hit the United States West Coast, killing millions, and it is reported that the entire west coast of the United States has been destroyed. The earthquakes have also caused major tsunamis in the world's oceans and disaster is just moments away.

Martin Webster and his wife Helen prepare for the oncoming disaster by gathering their children, Ronny and Mary Ann, and some essentials and head for a high rock formation to escape the floods. Martin leaves Helen and goes back to their house to get more food and clothes, but the destruction of New York begins while he is on his journey. Buildings crumble from earthquakes and large tsunamis strike the city. Martin returns to find that his wife and daughters are nowhere to be found. Isolated on a newly formed island near the former site of New York City in the aftermath of the disaster, the grief-stricken Martin, who believes that Helen and the children died in the disaster, builds a cabin and tries to survive on his own, hiding supplies in a tunnel.

Surviving in a cabin on the outskirts of another island in what had been New York City are two ruffians, Jephson and Norwood. They find world-class swimmer Claire Arlington unconscious and washed up on the shore outside their cabin. As she recovers, the men start feuding over her and become very possessive of her. When she is attacked, Claire flees and swims away, leaving the men angry and vengeful. Jephson kills Norwood and begins to search for her in a boat, vowing to bring her back. Claire reaches Martin's island in a state of exhaustion and collapses. Martin finds her, takes her back to his cabin, and nurses her back to health. Martin and Claire become good friends and eventually fall in love.

Meanwhile, survivors have gathered together nearby on the same island to form a town and start civilization again. Among the survivors is Martin's wife, Helen, and their two children. Tom, the town's leader, had found Helen in a poor state of health in the aftermath of the disaster, and has been taking care of her ever since. He has also fallen in love with her and asks her to marry him, but Helen is convinced that Martin is still alive and turns Tom down.

Jephson arrives on the island and finds Martin's tunnel. He then encounters a gang of thugs — which had been driven out of the town for committing crimes such as rape and theft — run by a man named Bellamy. Jephson tells the Bellamy gang about the tunnel and Claire. Jephson eventually finds Martin and Claire, subdues Martin in a violent fight, and kidnaps Claire, taking her to the Bellamy gang's hideout. As Jephson is about to rape Claire, Martin sneaks into the camp and rescues her. Martin and Claire then hide in the tunnel, but Jephson and the Bellamy gang follow them there. Finding that Martin is armed, Jephson orders the gang to set a fire at the entrance of the tunnel to force Martin and Claire out. After that plan fails, Jephson enters the tunnel and becomes involved in a fight with Martin, during which Claire kills Jephson with a spiked club. Meanwhile, a band of vigilantes led by Tom tracks the gang to the tunnel, rescues Martin and Claire, and brings them to the town.

In the town, Martin is reunited with Helen and their children and tells Helen about his relationship with Claire. Martin explains to Claire how he is in love with both his wife and with her and that he will not choose between them. Martin's and Helen's continued commitment to one another devastates Claire and Tom. Helen visits Claire and they have a painful discussion in which Claire says that she will not give up Martin.

Finding the town plagued by ugly disputes over the distribution of goods, Martin organizes an auction and establishes a successful monetary system for the community. Martin is elected the town's mayor. When Claire sees Martin with Helen at a town meeting, her heart breaks and she runs to the ocean and swims out to sea. Martin is left on shore watching her go.

== Main cast ==
- Peggy Shannon as Claire
- Sidney Blackmer as Martin
- Lois Wilson as Helen
- Matt Moore as Tom
- Fred Kohler as Jephson
- Ralf Harolde as Norwood
- Edward Van Sloan as Prof. Carlysle
- Samuel Hinds as Chief Forecaster

== Production notes ==
The film opens with a quote from the Bible's Book of Genesis, Chapter 9, verse 11: "And I shall establish my covenant with you; neither shall all flesh be cut off any more by the waters of the flood; neither shall there any more be a flood to destroy the earth."

S. Fowler Wright, the author of the 1928 novel upon which the film was based, began pitching a script based on the book to studios in 1933. In May, he accepted an offer from Worldwide Studios for $5,000 for the options. Wright's script for a film version was not used. The independent, Admiral/K.B.S. Productions, produced the film with a budget of $171,000, equivalent to approximately 3.51 million in 2020. Wright later watched the final scenes being shot and was disappointed to learn that producers had made changes and chose to not use the ending of the book as the film's ending. He later wrote in his diary that he felt the film was "ghastly" and advised his children not to see it.

While Deluge was the first film to visualize the total destruction of New York City, it was filmed entirely in Los Angeles. Many films have since continued to use New York as the center for their apocalyptic and post-apocalyptic storylines. A scene in Deluge that features a tidal wave that leaves New York submerged in water with nearly all inhabitants drowned later was recreated in the 2004 disaster film The Day After Tomorrow.

The special effects were done by Ned Mann, Russell E. Lawson, and Billy Williams. Mann later worked on the H. G. Wells-scripted film Things to Come (1936).

Part of the stock footage of ships and planes returning to port under severe storm warnings includes actual footage of the large United States Navy rigid airship USS Macon (ZRS-5), which later was lost at sea in 1935.

== Reception ==
Deluge received mixed but mostly positive reviews upon its release. It was a modest hit for RKO.

== Preservation status ==
Republic Pictures later bought the film for just its special effects footage, using some of the scenes of destruction in S.O.S. Tidal Wave (1939), Dick Tracy vs Crime Inc (1941), and King of the Rocket Men (1949).

For many years, Deluge was considered a lost film. In 1981, Forrest J Ackerman discovered a print, dubbed in Italian (La distruzione del mondo), in a film archive in Italy.

Kansas City film distributor and collector Wade Williams claimed to have discovered an Italian-language nitrate film print in the basement of an old mansion in Rome in 1981. It belonged to Williams' friend and Italian film producer Luigi Cozzi (aka Lewis Coates). Ackerman, his wife Wyndane, and Williams were guest speakers at a science fiction festival in Rome. Ackerman verified it was a lost film in the U.S. After Williams bought the access rights, he made a duplicate preservation negative and 35mm print. It was subtitled in English for its first VHS release by Englewood Entertainment. The 35mm print was re-released theatrically and played at the Film Forum in New York City and at other revival houses and archives.

A 35mm nitrate duplicate negative with its original English soundtrack was discovered in 2016. A 2K restoration scan was made by Lobster Films. This restoration was picked up for a limited theatrical re-release by Kino Repertory. A home media Blu-ray release by Kino Lorber Studio Classics appeared in February 2017.

== See also ==
- List of apocalyptic films
- List of rediscovered films
- List of incomplete or partially lost films
