= Eadric, Ealdorman of Wessex =

Ealdorman of Wessex from 942 to 949

Eadric
- Ealdorman

Ealdorman of Wessex
- Reign: c. 942 – 949
- Predecessor: Ælfhere
- Successor: Æthelsige
- Father: Æthelfrith
- Mother: Æthelgyth

Eadric (Ædric) (died 949) was a tenth-century ealdorman of Wessex. He was the youngest of four sons of Æthelfrith, an ealdorman in Mercia, and his wife Æthelgyth. From 946 until his death in 949 Eadric was the second most senior ealdorman in England, surpassed only by his brother Æthelstan Half-King.

== Biography ==
Eadric was born to Æthelfrith, an ealdorman who ruled territory in southern and eastern Mercia, and his wife Æthelgyth, who came from a family with considerable wealth that owned land in Buckinghamshire. Eadric was the youngest of four brothers, the other three being Ælfstan, Æthelstan Half-King, and Æthelwold, all four of whom were made ealdormen between 925 and 950. Ælfstan, the eldest brother, succeeded to his father's ealdordom upon the death of his father around 915, though he died in 934. Æthelstan Half-King was made Ealdorman of East Anglia in 932, though his jurisdiction also included Cambridgeshire, Northamptonshire, Huntingdonshire and parts of Lincolnshire. Æthelwold was granted an ealdordom in 940, ruling over Kent and neighbouring counties including Essex. Eadric was the last of the four brothers to be granted an ealdordom, ruling over central Wessex from 942 onwards. He succeeded a man named Ælfhere as ealdorman.

By about 945 Eadric and his two surviving brothers between them controlled over half the kingdom. Beginning in 943 Æthelstan is listed first among the king's ealdormen when witnessing charters, indicating his premier position. Æthelwold is listed second and Eadric is listed between third and sixth depending on the particular charter. Æthelwold died in 946, leaving land in Sussex and on the Berkshire Downs to Eadric. A later charter by King Eadred details land at these same two places to be given to Eadric, though it is not known whether this refers to new land or is simply of a confirmation of the land left to Eadric by his brother. Following Æthelwold's death Eadric is listed second only to his brother Æthelstan when witnessing royal charters. Eadric died in 949 and was succeeded as ealdorman by Æthelsige.

It is possible that Eadric was the father of Æthelweard (historian), if true then he had at least four children, the others being Æthelweard's siblings Ælfweard, Ælfgifu and Ælfwaru. This identification rests on Ælfgifu's possession of the estate of Risborough, which had belonged to Eadric's mother, Æthelgyth. Ælfgifu is often identified with Ælfgifu, wife of Eadwig, and that queen's documented mother, Æthelgifu, would then be Eadric's wife.

== Sources ==
- Hart, Cyril (1973). "Athelstan 'Half King' and his family". Anglo-Saxon England. 2. Cambridge University Press: 115–144. doi:10.1017/s0263675100000375. ISBN 0-521-20218-3.
- Hart, Cyril (2004). "Æthelstan (fl. 932–956)". Oxford Dictionary of National Biography (online ed.). Oxford University Press. doi:10.1093/ref:odnb/8917. (Subscription, Wikipedia Library access or UK public library membership required.) Subscription or UK public library membership required.
- Lapidge, Michael; Blair, John; Keynes, Simon; Scragg, Donald (2 October 2013). The Wiley Blackwell Encyclopedia of Anglo-Saxon England. John Wiley & Sons. ISBN 978-1-118-31610-8.
- Woolf, Alex (2007). From Pictland to Alba: 789 - 1070. Edinburgh University Press. ISBN 978-0-7486-1234-5.
