= Cultural depictions of Æthelflæd =

Æthelflæd, the 9th-century Lady of the Mercians, has been depicted on screen and in literature.

== In literature ==
- The novel A Chronicle of Ethelfled (1861), by Anne Manning, focused on the relationship between Æthelflæd (called "Ethelfled" in the novel) and her father, King Alfred.
- The 1930 novel Elfwin by S. Fowler Wright features Æthelflæd (called Ethelfleda in the text).
- The young adult novel The Edge on the Sword (2003) by Rebecca Tingle deals with Aethelflaeda as a young woman.
- In Bernard Cornwell's "Saxon Stories" series she appears in a number of the books.
- The 2012 novel The Bone Thief by V.M. Whitworth features Æthelflæd as a character.
- Æthelflæd is the protagonist of the novel To Be a Queen (2013) by Annie Whitehead.
- The short story "The Lady of the Mercians" by Sue Purkiss revolves around Æthelflæd's life. Purkiss' story appeared in the anthology of historical fiction, Daughters of Time (2014) edited by Mary Hoffman.

== On screen ==
In the television series The Last Kingdom she was played by Millie Brady from 2017-2022.
