= Æthelflæd =

Ruler of Mercia in England from 911 to 918

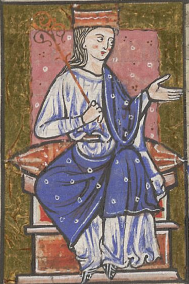
- Æthelflæd (from The Cartulary and Customs of Abingdon Abbey, c. 1220)

Lady of the Mercians
- Reign: 911–918
- Predecessor: Æthelred
- Successor: Ælfwynn
- Born: c. 870
- Died: 12 June 918 (aged c. 48); Tamworth, Staffordshire, Mercia
- Burial: St Oswald's Priory, Gloucester
- Spouse: Æthelred, Lord of the Mercians
- Issue: Ælfwynn
- House: Wessex
- Father: Alfred the Great
- Mother: Ealhswith

Æthelflæd (c. 870 – 12 June 918) ruled as Lady of the Mercians in the English Midlands from 911 until her death in 918. She was the eldest child of Alfred the Great, king of the Anglo-Saxon kingdom of Wessex, and his wife Ealhswith.

Æthelflæd was born around 870 at the height of the Viking invasions of England. By 878, most of England was under Danish Viking rule – East Anglia and Northumbria having been conquered, and Mercia partitioned between the English and the Vikings – but in that year Alfred won a crucial victory at the Battle of Edington. Soon afterwards the English-controlled western half of Mercia came under the rule of Æthelred, Lord of the Mercians, who accepted Alfred's overlordship. Alfred adopted the title King of the Anglo-Saxons (previously he was titled King of the West Saxons like his predecessors) claiming to rule all Anglo-Saxon people not living in areas under Viking control. In the mid-880s, Alfred sealed the strategic alliance between the surviving English kingdoms by marrying Æthelflæd to Æthelred.

Æthelred played a major role in fighting off renewed Viking attacks in the 890s, together with Æthelflæd's brother, the future King Edward the Elder. Æthelred and Æthelflæd fortified Worcester, gave generous donations to Mercian churches and built a new minster in Gloucester. Æthelred's health probably declined early in the next decade, after which it is likely that Æthelflæd was mainly responsible for the government of Mercia. Edward had succeeded as King of the Anglo-Saxons in 899, and in 909 he sent a West Saxon and Mercian force to raid the northern Danelaw. They returned with the remains of the royal Northumbrian saint Oswald, which were translated to the new Gloucester minster. Æthelred died in 911 and Æthelflæd then ruled Mercia as Lady of the Mercians. The accession of a female ruler in Mercia is described by the historian Ian Walker as "one of the most unique events in early medieval history".

Alfred had built a network of fortified burhs and in the 910s Edward and Æthelflæd embarked on a programme of extending them. Among the towns where she built defences were Wednesbury, Bridgnorth, Tamworth, Stafford, Warwick, Chirbury and Runcorn. In 917 she sent an army to capture Derby, the first of the Five Boroughs of the Danelaw to fall to the English, a victory described by Tim Clarkson as "her greatest triumph". In 918 Leicester surrendered without a fight. Shortly afterwards the Viking leaders of York offered her their loyalty, but she died on 12 June 918 before she could take advantage of the offer, and a few months later Edward completed the conquest of Mercia. Æthelflæd was succeeded by her daughter Ælfwynn, but in December Edward took personal control of Mercia and carried Ælfwynn off to Wessex.

Historians disagree whether Mercia was an independent kingdom under Æthelred and Æthelflæd but they agree that Æthelflæd was a great ruler who played an important part in the conquest of the Danelaw. She was praised by Anglo-Norman chroniclers such as William of Malmesbury, who described her as "a powerful accession to [Edward's] party, the delight of his subjects, the dread of his enemies, a woman of enlarged soul". According to Pauline Stafford, "like ... Elizabeth I she became a wonder to later ages". In Nick Higham's view, medieval and modern writers have been so captivated by her that Edward's reputation has suffered unfairly in comparison.

== Background ==
Mercia was the dominant kingdom in southern England in the eighth century and maintained its position until it suffered a decisive defeat by Wessex at the Battle of Ellendun in 825. Thereafter the two kingdoms became allies, which was to be an important factor in English resistance to the Vikings.

In 865 the Viking Great Heathen Army landed in East Anglia and used this as a starting point for an invasion. The East Anglians were forced to buy peace and the following year the Vikings invaded Northumbria, where they appointed a puppet king in 867. They then moved on Mercia, where they spent the winter of 867–868. King Burgred of Mercia was joined by King Æthelred of Wessex and his brother, the future King Alfred, for a combined attack on the Vikings, who refused an engagement; in the end the Mercians bought peace with them. The following year, the Vikings conquered East Anglia. In 874 the Vikings expelled King Burgred and Ceolwulf became the last King of Mercia with their support. In 877 the Vikings partitioned Mercia, taking the eastern regions for themselves and allowing Ceolwulf to keep the western ones. He was described by the Anglo-Saxon Chronicle as "a foolish king's thegn" who was a puppet of the Vikings. The historian Ann Williams regards this view as partial and distorted, that he was accepted as a true king by the Mercians and by King Alfred. The situation was transformed the following year when Alfred won a decisive victory over the Danes at the Battle of Edington.

Ceolwulf is not recorded after 879. His successor as the ruler of the English western half of Mercia, Æthelflæd's husband Æthelred, is first seen in 881 when, according to the historian of medieval Wales, Thomas Charles-Edwards, he led an unsuccessful Mercian invasion of the north Welsh Kingdom of Gwynedd. In 883, he made a grant with the consent of King Alfred, thus acknowledging Alfred's lordship. In 886 Alfred occupied the Mercian town of London, which had been in Viking hands. He then received the submission of all English not under Viking control and handed control of London over to Æthelred. In the 890s, Æthelred and Edward, Alfred's son and future successor, fought off more Viking attacks. Alfred died in 899 and Edward's claim to the throne was disputed by Æthelwold, son of Alfred's elder brother. Æthelwold joined forces with the Vikings when he was unable to get sufficient support in Wessex, and his rebellion only ended with his death in battle in December 902.

== Sources ==
The most important source for history in this period is the Anglo-Saxon Chronicle but Æthelflæd is almost ignored in the standard West Saxon version, in what F. T. Wainwright calls "a conspiracy of silence". He argues that King Edward was anxious not to encourage Mercian separatism and did not wish to publicise his sister's accomplishments, in case she became a symbol of Mercian claims. Brief details of her actions were preserved in a pro-Mercian version of the Chronicle known as the Mercian Register or the Annals of Æthelflæd; although it is now lost, elements were incorporated into several surviving versions of the Chronicle. The Register covers the years 902 to 924, and focuses on Æthelflæd's actions; Edward is hardly mentioned and her husband only twice, on his death and as father of their daughter. (Note: A translation of the Mercian Register is an appendix in Tim Clarkson's biography of Æthelflæd.) Information about Æthelflæd's career is also preserved in the Irish chronicle known as the Three Fragments. According to Wainwright, it "contains much that is legendary rather than historical. But it also contains, especially for our period, much genuine historical information which seems to have its roots in a contemporary narrative." She was praised by Anglo-Norman chroniclers such as William of Malmesbury and John of Worcester and she has received more attention from historians than any other secular woman in Anglo-Saxon England.

== Family ==
Æthelflæd was born around 870, the oldest child of King Alfred the Great and his Mercian wife, Ealhswith, who was a daughter of Æthelred Mucel, ealdorman of the Gaini, one of the tribes of Mercia. (Note: Marios Costambeys dates Æthelflæd's birth to the early 870s, but Maggie Bailey argues that as she was her parents' first child and they married in 868, she was probably born in 869–70.) Ealhswith's mother, Eadburh, was a member of the Mercian royal house, probably a descendant of King Coenwulf (796–821). Æthelflæd was thus half-Mercian and the alliance between Wessex and Mercia was sealed by her marriage to Æthelred, Lord of the Mercians. They are mentioned in Alfred's will, which probably dates to the 880s. Æthelflæd, described only as "my eldest daughter", received an estate and 100 mancuses, while Æthelred, the only ealdorman to be mentioned by name, received a sword worth 100 mancuses. Æthelflæd was first recorded as Æthelred's wife in a charter of 887, when he granted two estates to the see of Worcester "with the permission and sign-manual of King Alfred" and the attestors included "Æthelflæd conjux". The marriage may have taken place earlier, perhaps when he submitted to Alfred following the recovery of London in 886. Æthelred was much older than Æthelflæd and they had one known child, a daughter called Ælfwynn. According to William of Malmesbury, Æthelstan, the eldest son of Edward the Elder and future king of England, was brought up in the Mercian court, and this receives some support from a document dating to the reign of Edward I which refers to a grant made by Æthelstan in accordance with "the pact of paternal piety which formerly he pledged with Æthelred, ealdorman of the people of the Mercians". In the view of the historian Martin Ryan, Æthelstan certainly campaigned in Mercia with his uncle and aunt.

Æthelred's descent is unknown. Richard Abels describes him as "somewhat of a mysterious character", who may have claimed royal blood and been related to Æthelred Mucel. In the view of Ian Walker: "He was a royal ealdorman whose power base lay in the south-west of Mercia in the former kingdom of the Hwicce around Gloucester". Alex Woolf suggests that he was probably the son of King Burgred of Mercia and King Alfred's sister Æthelswith, although that would mean that the marriage between Æthelflæd and Æthelred was uncanonical, because Rome then forbade marriage between first cousins.

== Æthelflæd and Æthelred ==
Compared to the rest of England, much of English Mercia —Gloucestershire, Worcestershire, Herefordshire and Shropshire —was unusually stable in the Viking age. It did not suffer major attacks and it did not come under great pressure from Wessex. Mercian scholarship had high prestige at the courts of Alfred and Edward. Worcester was able to preserve considerable intellectual and liturgical continuity and, with Gloucester, became the centre of a Mercian revival under Æthelred and Æthelflæd that extended into the more unstable areas of Staffordshire and Cheshire. Charters show the Mercian leaders supporting the revival by their generosity to monastic communities. In 883 Æthelred granted privileges to Berkeley Abbey and in the 890s he and Æthelflæd issued a charter in favour of the church of Worcester. This was the only occasion in Alfred's lifetime when they are known to have acted jointly; generally Æthelred acted on his own, usually acknowledging the permission of King Alfred. Æthelflæd witnessed five surviving charters of Æthelred between 887 and 901. In 901 Æthelflæd and Æthelred gave land and a golden chalice weighing thirty mancuses to the shrine of Saint Mildburg at Much Wenlock church.

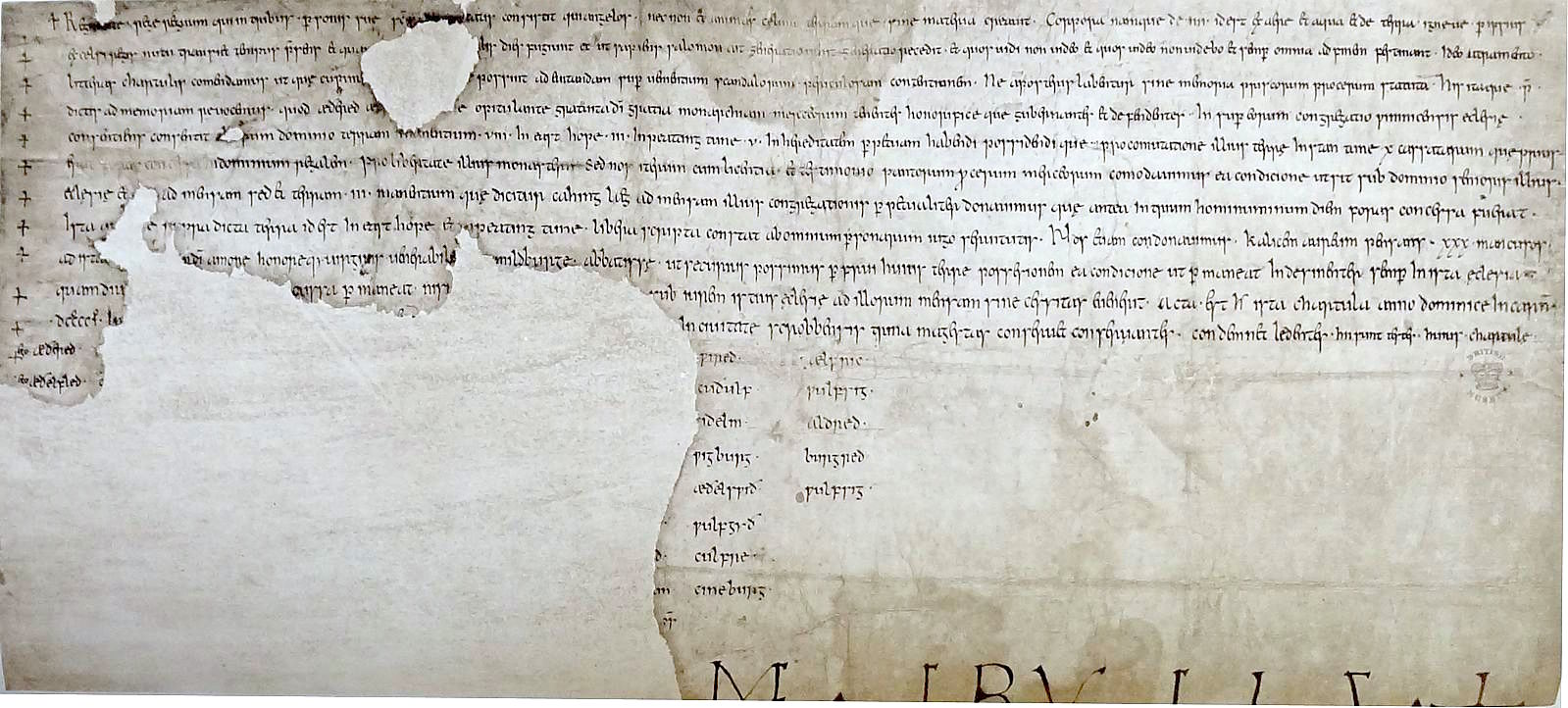
Charter S 221, dated 901, of Æthelred and Ætheflæd, donating land and a golden chalice to Much Wenlock church.

At the end of the ninth century, Æthelred and Æthelflæd fortified Worcester, with the permission of King Alfred and at the request of Bishop Werferth, described in the charter as "their friend". They granted the church of Worcester a half share of the rights of lordship over the city, covering land rents and the proceeds of justice, and in return the cathedral community agreed in perpetuity to dedicate a psalm to them three times a day and a mass and thirty psalms every Saturday. As the rights of lordship had previously belonged fully to the church, this represented the beginning of transfer from episcopal to secular control of the city. In 904 Bishop Werferth granted a lease of land in the city to Æthelred and Æthelflæd, to be held for the duration of their lives and that of their daughter Ælfwynn. The land was valuable, including most of the city's usable river frontage, and control of it enabled the Mercian rulers to dominate over and profit from the city.

Æthelred's health probably declined several years before his death in 911, with the result that Æthelflæd became the de facto ruler of Mercia, perhaps as early as 902, although he witnessed charters at a meeting attended by the king in 903. According to the Three Fragments, the Norse (Norwegian) Vikings were expelled from Dublin and then made an abortive attack on Wales. When this failed they applied to Æthelflæd for permission to settle near Chester. Æthelflæd agreed, perhaps in the hope that they would provide protection against attack by other Vikings. These events probably date to 902-903. The Anglo-Saxon Chronicle states that in 907 Chester was "restored". Æthelflæd was probably responsible for restoration of the town's Roman defences by running walls from the north-west and south-east corners of the fort to the River Dee. The Norse Vikings later joined with the Danes in an attack on Chester, but this failed because Æthelflæd had fortified the town, and she persuaded the Irish among the attackers to change sides. Most historians date the attack on Chester to 907, but Matthew Firth argues that 910 is more likely and that it may have been part of the invasion which ended in Viking defeat at the Battle of Tettenhall. Simon Ward, who excavated an Anglo-Saxon site in Chester, sees the later prosperity of the town as owing much to the planning of Æthelflæd and Edward. After Æthelflæd's death, Edward encountered fierce resistance to his efforts to consolidate his control of the north-west and he died there in 924, shortly after suppressing a local rebellion.

In 909 Edward sent a West Saxon and Mercian force to the northern Danelaw, where it raided for five weeks. The remains of the royal Northumbrian saint Oswald were seized and taken from his resting place in Bardney Abbey in Lincolnshire to Gloucester. In the late ninth century Gloucester had become a burh with a street plan similar to Winchester, and Æthelred and Æthelflæd had repaired its ancient Roman defences. In 896 a meeting of the Mercian witan was held in the royal hall at Kingsholm, just outside the town. The Mercian rulers built a new minster in Gloucester and, although the building was small, it was embellished on a grand scale, with rich sculpture. The church appears to have been an exact copy of the Old Minster, Winchester. It was initially dedicated to St Peter but when Oswald's remains were brought to Gloucester in 909, Æthelflæd had them translated from Bardney to the new minster, which was renamed St Oswald's in his honour. The relics gave the church great prestige as Oswald had been one of the most important founding saints of Anglo-Saxon Christianity as well as a ruling monarch, and the decision to translate his relics to Gloucester shows the importance of the town to Æthelred and Æthelflæd, who were buried in St Oswald's Minster. Simon Keynes describes the town as "the main seat of their power" and Carolyn Heighway believes that the foundation of the church was probably a family and dynastic enterprise, encouraged by Alfred and supported by Edward and Bishop Werferth. Heighway and Michael Hare wrote:

In the age when English scholarship and religion reached their lowest ebb, Mercia and in particular the lower Severn valley seem to have maintained traditional standards of learning. It is in this context that the establishment of a new minster at Gloucester by Æthelred and Æthelflæd is to be seen.

Mercia had a long tradition of venerating royal saints and this was enthusiastically supported by Æthelred and Æthelflæd. Saintly relics were believed to give supernatural legitimacy to rulers' authority, and Æthelflæd was probably responsible for the foundation or re-foundation of Chester Minster and the transfer to it of the remains of the seventh-century Mercian princess Saint Werburgh from Hanbury in Staffordshire. She may also have translated the relics of the martyred Northumbrian prince Ealhmund from Derby to Shrewsbury. In 910 the Danes retaliated against the English attack of the previous year by invading Mercia, raiding as far as Bridgnorth in Shropshire. On their way back they were caught by an English army in Staffordshire and their army was destroyed at the Battle of Tettenhall, opening the way for the recovery of the Danish Midlands and East Anglia over the next decade.

== Lady of the Mercians ==
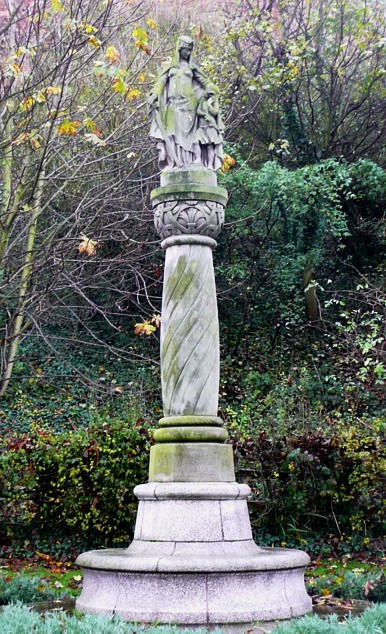
Statue in Tamworth of Æthelflæd with her nephew Æthelstan, erected in 1913 to commemorate the millennium of her fortification of the town.

On her husband's death in 911, Æthelflæd became Myrcna hlædige, "Lady of the Mercians". Ian Walker describes her succession as the only case of a female ruler of a kingdom in Anglo-Saxon history and "one of the most unique events in early medieval history". In Wessex, royal women were not allowed to play any political role; Alfred's wife was not granted the title of queen and was never a witness to charters in the king's lifetime. In Mercia, Alfred's sister Æthelswith had been the wife of King Burgred of Mercia; she had witnessed charters as queen and had made grants jointly with her husband and in her own name. Æthelflæd benefited from a Mercian tradition of queenly importance, and was able to play a key role in the history of the early tenth century as Lady of the Mercians, which would not have been possible in Wessex.

When Æthelred died, Edward took control of the Mercian towns of London and Oxford and their hinterlands, which Alfred had put under Mercian control. Ian Walker suggests that Æthelflæd accepted this loss of territory in return for recognition by her brother of her position in Mercia. Alfred had constructed a network of fortified burhs in Wessex, and Edward and Æthelflæd now embarked on a programme of extending them to consolidate their defences and provide bases for attacks on the Vikings. According to Frank Stenton, Æthelflæd led Mercian armies on expeditions, which she planned. He commented: "It was through reliance on her guardianship of Mercia that her brother was enabled to begin the forward movement against the southern Danes which is the outstanding feature of his reign".

Æthelflæd had already fortified an unknown location called Bremesburh in 910 and in 912 she built defences at Bridgnorth to cover a crossing of the River Severn. In 913 she built forts at Tamworth to guard against the Danes in Leicester, and in Stafford to cover access from the Trent Valley. In 914 a Mercian army drawn from Gloucester and Hereford repelled a Viking invasion from Brittany, and the Iron Age Eddisbury hill fort was repaired to protect against invasion from Northumbria or Cheshire, while Warwick was fortified as further protection against the Leicester Danes. In 915 Chirbury was fortified to guard a route from Wales and Runcorn on the River Mersey. Defences were built before 914 at Hereford, and probably Shrewsbury and two other fortresses, at Scergeat and Weardbyrig, which have not been located.

In 917 invasions by three Viking armies failed as Æthelflæd sent an army which captured Derby and the territory around it. The town was one of the Five Boroughs of the Danelaw, together with Leicester, Lincoln, Nottingham and Stamford. Derby was the first to fall to the English. The Mercian Register states that she lost "four of her thegns who were dear to her" in the battle, an unusual statement which the historian Matthew Firth argues indicates these to have been key members of her court. Clarkson, who describes Æthelflæd as "renowned as a competent war-leader", regards the victory at Derby as "her greatest triumph". At the end of the year, the East Anglian Danes submitted to Edward. In early 918, Æthelflæd gained possession of Leicester without opposition and most of the local Danish army submitted to her. A few months later, the leading men of Danish-ruled York offered to pledge their loyalty to Æthelflæd, probably to secure her support against Norse raiders from Ireland, but she died on 12 June 918, before she could take advantage of the offer. No similar offer is known to have been made to Edward. According to the Three Fragments, in 918 Æthelflæd led an army of Scots and Northumbrian English against forces led by the Norse Viking leader Ragnall at the Battle of Corbridge in Northumbria. Historians consider this unlikely, but she may have sent a contingent to the battle. Both sides claimed victory but Ragnall was able to establish himself as ruler of Northumbria. In the Three Fragments, Æthelflæd also formed a defensive alliance with the Scots and the Strathclyde British, a claim accepted by Clarkson.

Little is known of Æthelflæd's relations with the Welsh. The only recorded event took place in 916, when she sent an expedition to avenge the murder of a Mercian abbot and his companions; her men destroyed the royal crannog of Brycheiniog on Llangorse Lake and captured the queen and thirty-three of her companions. The incursion reestablished Mercian overlordship over Brycheiniog, which had sworn allegiance to King Alfred in the late ninth century. According to a version of the Anglo-Saxon Chronicle strongly sympathetic to Edward the Elder, after Æthelflæd's death "the kings among the Welsh, Hywel and Clydog and Idwal, and all the Welsh people sought to have [Edward] as their lord". Hywel Dda was king of Dyfed in south-west Wales, Clydog ap Cadell probably king of Powys in the north-east, and Idwal ab Anarawd king of Gwynedd in the north-west. Gwent in south-east Wales was already under West Saxon lordship but, in the view of Charles-Edwards, this passage shows that the other Welsh kingdoms were under Mercian lordship until Edward took direct power over Mercia.

No coins were issued with the name of Æthelred or Æthelflæd on them, but in the 910s silver pennies were minted in west Mercian towns with unusual ornamental designs on the reverse and this may have reflected Æthelflæd's desire to distinguish specie issued under her control from that of her brother. After her death, west Mercian coin reverses were again the same as those on coins produced in Wessex. No charters of Edward survive for the period between 910 and his death in 924. In contrast, two survive in Æthelflæd's sole name, S 224, possibly dating to 914 and S 225, dated 9 September 915, issued at Weardbyrig, one of the burhs she built at an unidentified location.

== Death and aftermath ==
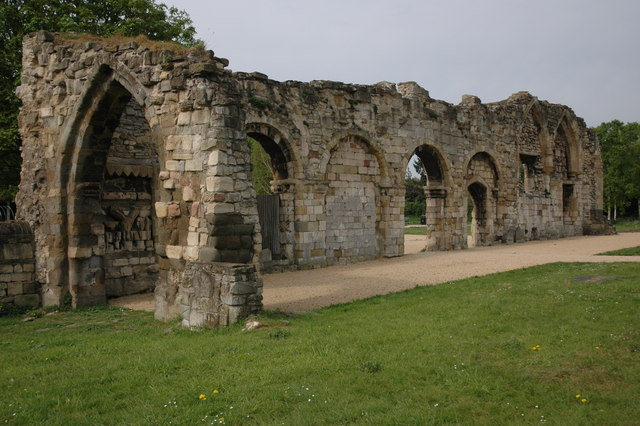
Twelfth and thirteenth century arches of St Oswald's Priory, Gloucester, where Æthelflæd and Æthelred were buried.

Æthelflæd died at Tamworth on 12 June 918 and her body was carried 75 miles (121 km) to Gloucester, where she was buried with her husband in their foundation, St Oswald's Minster. According to the Mercian Register, Æthelflæd was buried in the east porticus. A building suitable for a royal mausoleum has been found by archaeological investigation at the east end of the church and this may have been St Oswald's burial place. Placement next to the saint would have been a prestigious burial location for Æthelred and Æthelflæd. William of Malmesbury wrote that their burial places were found in the south porticus during building works in the early twelfth century. He may have been misinformed about the position but it is also possible that the tombs were moved from their prestigious position next to the saint, when the couple became less known over time or when tenth-century kings acted to minimise the honour paid to their Mercian predecessors.

The choice of burial place was symbolic. Victoria Thompson argues that if Æthelflæd had chosen Edward's royal mausoleum in Winchester as the burial place for her husband and herself, that would have emphasised Mercia's subordinate status, whereas a traditional Mercian royal burial place such as Repton would have been a provocative declaration of independence; Gloucester, near the border with Wessex, was a compromise between the two. Martin Ryan sees the foundation as "something like a royal mausoleum, intended to replace the one at Repton (Derbyshire) that had been destroyed by the Vikings". Æthelflæd died a few months too early to see the final conquest of the southern Danelaw by Edward. (Note: Edward did not conquer the Viking Kingdom of York in southern Northumbria. Æthelstan took control of it in 927 but after his death in 939 the kingdom was contested until the expulsion of the last Norse king in 954.) She was succeeded as Lady of the Mercians by her daughter, Ælfwynn, but in early December 918 Edward deposed her and took Mercia under his control. Many Mercians disliked the subordination of their ancient kingdom to Wessex, and Wainwright describes the Mercian annalist's description of the deposition of Ælfwynn as "heavy with resentment". Edward died in 924 at Farndon in Cheshire a few days after putting down a rebellion by Mercians and Welshmen at Chester.

== Legacy ==
To the West Saxon version of the Anglo-Saxon Chronicle, Æthelflæd was merely King Edward's sister, whereas for the Mercian Register she was Lady of the Mercians. Irish and Welsh annals described her as a queen and the Annals of Ulster, which ignore the deaths of Alfred and Edward, described her as famosissima regina Saxonum (renowned Saxon queen). She was also praised by Anglo-Norman historians such as John of Worcester and William of Malmesbury, who described her as "a powerful accession to [Edward's] party, the delight of his subjects, the dread of his enemies, a woman of enlarged soul". He claimed that she declined to have sex after the birth of her only child because it was "unbecoming of the daughter of a king to give way to a delight which, after a time, produced such painful consequences". According to Nick Higham, "successive medieval and modern writers were quite captivated by her" and her brother's reputation has suffered unfairly in comparison. In the twelfth century, Henry of Huntingdon paid her his own tribute:

O mighty Æthelflæd! O virgin, the dread of men,
conqueror of nature, worthy of a man’s name!
Nature made you a girl, so you would be more illustrious;
your prowess made you acquire the name of man.
For you alone it is right to change the name of your sex:
you were a mighty queen and a king who won victories.
Even Caesar’s triumphs did not bring such great rewards.
Virgin heroine, more illustrious then than Caesar, farewell. (Note: O Eilfleda potens, O terror uirgo uirorum, / Vucrix nature, nomine digna uiri. / Te, quo splendidior fieres, natura puellam, / Te probitas fecit nomen habere uiri. / Te mutare decet, sed solam, nomina sexus, / Tu regina potens rexque trophea parans. / Iam nec Cesarei tantum meruere triumphi, / Cesare splendidior, uirgo uirago uale.)

All three medieval writers, John of Worcester, William of Malmesbury and Henry of Huntingdon, rely mainly on versions of the Anglo-Saxon Chronicle in their eulogies of Æthelflæd, but they also go beyond the known sources, suggesting in Firth's view that "they were responding to cultural memory of her reign current in their own time".

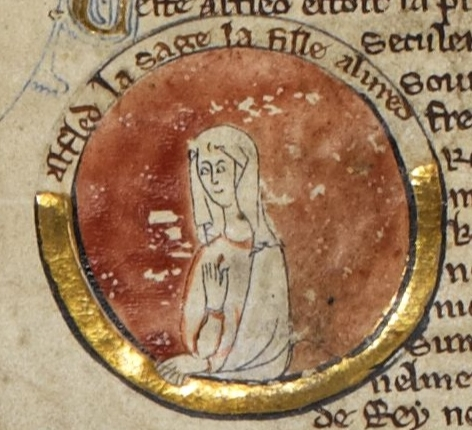
Æthelflæd in the thirteenth-century Genealogical Chronicle of the English Kings, British Library Royal MS 14 B V

Some historians believe that Æthelred and Æthelflæd were independent rulers. In the Handbook of British Chronology, David Dumville refers to "Q. Æthelflæd" and comments, "The titles given her by all sources (hlæfdige, regina) imply that she wielded royal power and authority". Alex Woolf concurs and Pauline Stafford describes Æthelflæd as "the last Mercian queen", referred to in charters in such terms as "by the gift of Christ's mercy ruling the government of the Mercians". Stafford argues that Æthelred and Æthelflæd exercised most or all of the powers of a monarch after Alfred's death but it would have been a provocative act formally to claim regality, especially after Æthelwold's rebellion. Stafford sees her as a "warrior queen", "Like ... Elizabeth I she became a wonder to later ages." According to Charles Insley,

The assumption that Mercia was in some sort of limbo in this period, subordinate to Wessex and waiting to be incorporated into "England" cannot be sustained ... Æthelred's death in 911 changed little, for his formidable wife carried on as sole ruler of Mercia until she died in 918. Only then did Mercia's independent existence come to an end.

Wainwright sees Æthelflæd as willingly accepting a subordinate role in a partnership with her brother and agreeing to his plan of unification of Wessex and Mercia under his rule. Wainwright argues that he probably sent his oldest son Æthelstan to be brought up in Mercia, to make him more acceptable to the Mercians as king; Æthelflæd does not appear to have tried to find a husband for her daughter, who must have been nearly thirty by 918. In Wainwright's view, she was ignored in West Saxon sources for fear that recognition of her achievements would encourage Mercian separatism:

[Æthelflæd] played a vital role in England in the first quarter of the tenth century. The success of Edward's campaigns against the Danes depended to a great extent upon her cooperation. In the Midlands and the North she came to dominate the political scene. And how she used her influence to make the unification of England possible under the kings of the West Saxon royal house. But her reputation has suffered from bad publicity, or rather from a conspiracy of silence among her West Saxon contemporaries.

Simon Keynes points out that all coins were issued in Edward's name, and while the Mercian rulers were able to issue some charters on their own authority, others acknowledged Edward's lordship. In 903 a Mercian ealdorman "petitioned King Edward, and also Æthelred and Æthelflæd, who then held rulership and power over the race of the Mercians under the aforesaid king". Keynes argues that a new polity was created when Æthelred submitted to Alfred in the 880s, covering Wessex and English (western) Mercia. In Keynes's view, "the conclusion seems inescapable that the Alfredian polity of the kingship 'of the Anglo-Saxons' persisted in the first quarter of the tenth century, and that the Mercians were thus under Edward's rule from the beginning of his reign". Ryan believes that the Mercian rulers "had a considerable but ultimately subordinate share of royal authority".

In Higham's view, Keynes makes a strong case that Edward ruled over an Anglo-Saxon state with a developing administrative and ideological unity but that Æthelflæd and Æthelred did much to encourage a separate Mercian identity, such as establishing cults of Mercian saints at their new burhs, as well as reverence for their great Northumbrian royal saint at Gloucester:

There must remain some doubt as to the extent to which Edward's intentions for the future were shared in all respects by his sister and brother-in-law, and one is left to wonder what might have occurred had their sole offspring been male rather than female. Celtic visions of Æthelred and Æthelflæd as king and queen certainly offer a different, and equally valid, contemporary take on the complex politics of this transition to a new English state.

== Commemoration ==
In June 2018, Æthelflæd's funeral was re-enacted in front of a crowd of 10,000 people in Gloucester, as part of a series of living history events marking the 1,100th anniversary of her death.

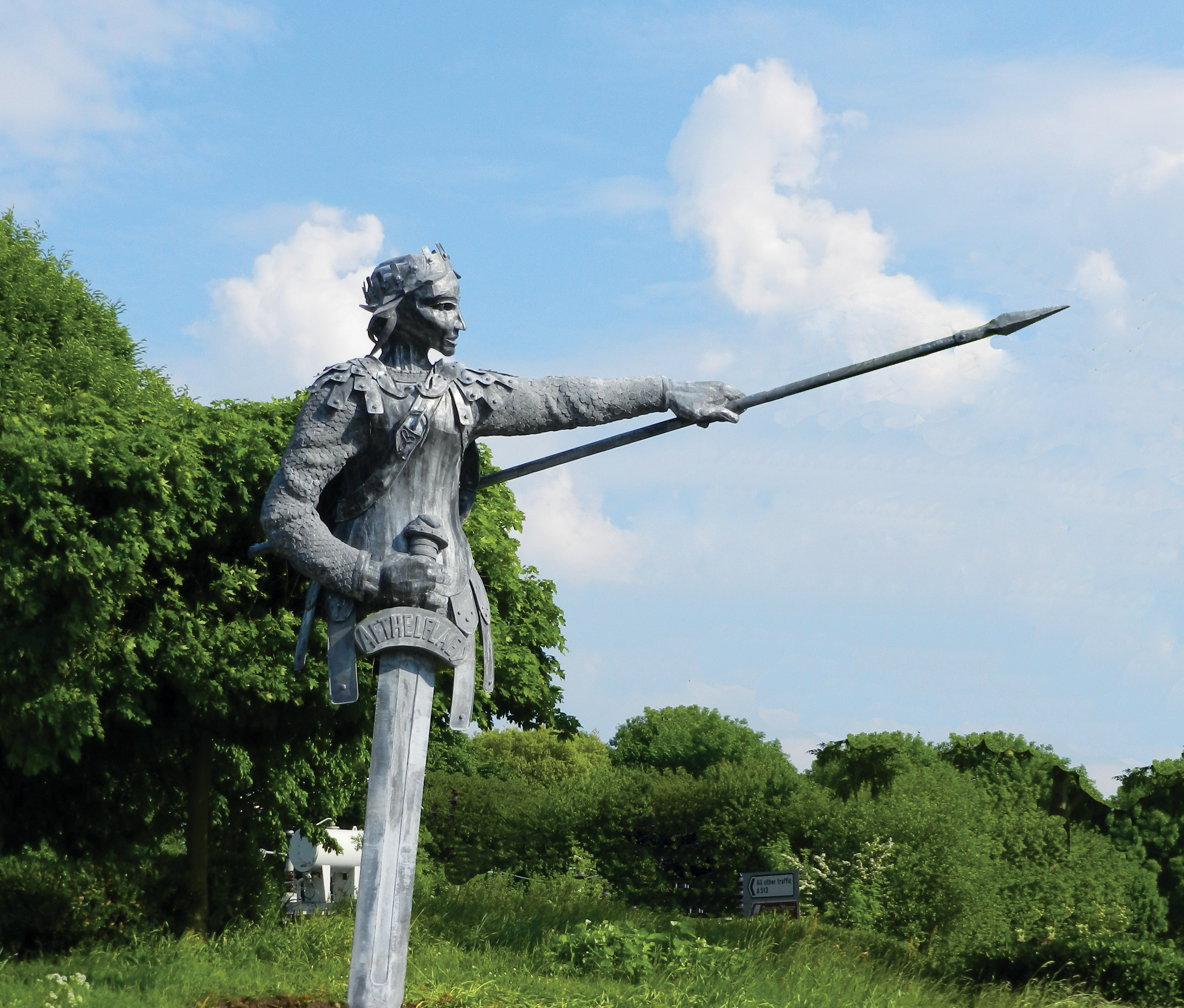
The new Æthelflaed statue outside Tamworth Railway Station, erected to commemorate 1,100 years since she died in Tamworth. Her spear points visitors towards the town centre and Tamworth Castle.

The 1,100th anniversary of the death of Æthelflaed was marked throughout 2018 in Tamworth with a number of major events, including the unveiling of a new six-metre statue, the creation of the town's biggest ever piece of community art, a major commemorative church service, talks, a special guided walk, commemorative ale and an academic conference weekend drawing academics and delegates from all over the world.

== See also ==
- Cultural depictions of Æthelflæd

== Bibliography ==
- Abels, Richard (1998). Alfred the Great: War, Kingship, and Culture in Anglo-Saxon England. Harlow, UK: Longman. ISBN 978-0-582-04047-2.
- Bailey, Maggie (2001). "Ælfwynn, Second Lady of the Mercians". In Higham, Nick; Hill, David (eds.). Edward the Elder 899–924. Abingdon, UK: Routledge. pp. 112–127. ISBN 978-0-415-21497-1.
- Baker, Nigel; Holt, Richard (2004). Urban Growth and the Medieval Church: Gloucester and Worcester. Aldershot, UK: Ashgate. ISBN 978-0-7546-0266-8.
- Blair, John (2005). The Church in Anglo-Saxon Society. Oxford, UK: Oxford University Press. ISBN 978-0-19-921117-3.
- Blair, John; Rippon, Stephen; Smart, Christopher (2020). Planning in the Early Medieval Landscape. Liverpool, UK: Liverpool University Press. ISBN 978-1-78962-116-7.
- Charles-Edwards, Thomas (2001). "Wales and Mercia 613–918". In Brown, Michelle P.; Farr, Carol A. (eds.). Mercia: An Anglo-Saxon Kingdom in Europe. London, UK: Leicester University Press. pp. 89–105. ISBN 978-0-7185-0231-7.
- Charles-Edwards, T. M. (2013). Wales and the Britons 350–1064. Oxford, UK: Oxford University Press. ISBN 978-0-19-821731-2.
- "Charter S 221". The Electronic Sawyer: Online Catalogue of Anglo-Saxon Charters. London, UK: King's College London.
- "Charter S 367". The Electronic Sawyer: Online Catalogue of Anglo-Saxon Charters. London, UK: King's College London.
- "Charter S 367a". The Electronic Sawyer: Online Catalogue of Anglo-Saxon Charters. London, UK: King's College London.
- Clarkson, Tim (2014). Strathclyde and the Anglo-Saxons in the Viking Age. Edinburgh, UK: John Donald. ISBN 978-1-906566-78-4.
- Clarkson, Tim (2018). Æthelflæd: The Lady of the Mercians. Edinburgh, UK: John Donald. ISBN 978-1-910900-16-1.
- Costambeys, Marios (2004a). "Æthelflæd [Ethelfleda] (d. 918), ruler of the Mercians". Oxford Dictionary of National Biography. Vol. 1. Oxford University Press. doi:10.1093/ref:odnb/8907. ISBN 9780198614128. (subscription, Wikipedia Library access or UK public library membership required)
- Costambeys, Marios (2004b). "Æthelred (d. 911), ruler of the Mercians". Oxford Dictionary of National Biography. Oxford University Press. doi:10.1093/ref:odnb/52311. (subscription, Wikipedia Library access or UK public library membership required)
- Dockray-Miller, Mary (2000). Motherhood and Mothering in Anglo-Saxon England. New York, NY: St Martin's Press. ISBN 978-0-312-22721-0.
- Downham, Clare (2007). Viking Kings of Britain and Ireland: The Dynasty of Ívarr to A.D. 1014. Edinburgh, UK: Dunedin. ISBN 978-1-906716-06-6.
- "Ethelfleda and Athelstan". Public Monuments & Sculpture Association. Archived from the original on 4 March 2016.
- Dumville, David (1996). "The local rulers of Anglo-Saxon England to AD 927". In Fryde, E. B.; Greenway, D. E.; Porter, S.; Roy, I. (eds.). Handbook of British Chronology (3rd, with corrections ed.). Cambridge, UK: Cambridge University Press. pp. 1–25. ISBN 978-0-521-56350-5.
- Firth, Matthew (2022). "On the Dating of the Norse Siege of Chester". Notes & Queries. 69: 1–4. doi:10.1093/notesj/gjac009. ISSN 1471-6941.
- Firth, Matthew; Schilling, Cassandra (2023). "The Lonely Afterlives of Early English Queens". Neophilologus. 107 (1): 127–43. doi:10.1007/s11061-022-09739-4. ISSN 0028-2677.
- Firth, Matthew (2024). Early English Queens, 850-1000: Potestas Reginae. London, UK: Routledge. ISBN 978-1-0031-6545-3.
- Firth, Matthew (2025a). "Æthelflæd and the Lacunae in Cotton Charter VIII.27 (S221)". Notes & Queries. 72 (2): 97–101. doi:10.1093/notesj/gjaf036. ISSN 1471-6941.
- Firth, Matthew (2025b). "'Cesare splendidior': Anglo-Norman Memories of Æthelflæd of Mercia". In Firth, Matthew (ed.). Pre-Conquest History and its Medieval Reception: Writing England's Past. York, UK: York Medieval Press. pp. 192–211. doi:10.1515/9781805435174-014. ISBN 978-1-805-43517-4.
- Fleming, Robin (2010). Britain after Rome: The Fall and the Rise, 400 to 1070. London, UK: Penguin Books. ISBN 978-0-14-014823-7.
- Foot, Sarah (2011). Æthelstan: The First King of the English. New Haven, USA: Yale University Press. ISBN 978-0-3001-8771-7.
- Henry of Huntingdon (1996). Greenway, Diana (ed.). Historia Anglorum: History of the English People. Oxford, UK: Clarendon Press. ISBN 978-0-1982-2224-8.
- Gretsch, Mechtild (2001). "The Junius Psalter Gloss". In Higham, N. J.; Hill, D. H. (eds.). Edward the Elder 899–924. Abingdon, UK: Routledge. pp. 280–291. ISBN 978-0-415-21497-1.
- Griffiths, David (2001). "The North-West Frontier". In Higham, N. J.; Hill, D. H. (eds.). Edward the Elder 899–924. Abingdon, UK: Routledge. pp. 161–187. ISBN 978-0-415-21497-1.
- Hadley, Dawn (2006). The Vikings in England. Manchester, UK: Manchester University Press. ISBN 978-0-7190-5982-7.
- Hall, R. A. (2014). "York". In Lapidge, Michael; Blair, John; Keynes, Simon; Scragg, Donald (eds.). The Wiley Blackwell Encyclopaedia of Anglo-Saxon England (2nd ed.). Chichester, UK: Wiley Blackwell. pp. 518–520. ISBN 978-0-631-22492-1.
- Hart, Cyril (1973). "Athelstan 'Half King' and his family". Anglo-Saxon England. 2. London, UK: Cambridge University Press: 115–144. doi:10.1017/s0263675100000375. ISBN 978-0-521-20218-3. S2CID 162575949.
- Heighway, Carolyn M. (1984). "Anglo-Saxon Gloucester to AD 1000". In Gaull, Margaret L. (ed.). Studies in Late Anglo-Saxon Settlement. Oxford, UK: Oxford University Department for External Studies. pp. 35–53. ISBN 978-0-903736-17-6.
- Heighway, Caroline; Hare, Michael (1999). "Gloucester and the Minster of St Oswald: A Survey of the Evidence". In Heighway, Carolyn; Bryan, Richard (eds.). The Golden Minster: The Anglo-Saxon Minster and Later Medieval Priory of St Oswald at Gloucester. York, UK: Council for British Archaeology. pp. 1–29. ISBN 978-1-872414-94-2.
- Heighway, Carolyn (2001). "Gloucester and the New Minster of St Oswald". In Higham, Nick; Hill, David (eds.). Edward the Elder 899–924. London, UK: Routledge. pp. 102–111. ISBN 978-0-415-21497-1.
- Higham, Nick (2001a). "Edward the Elder's Reputation". In Higham, Nick; Hill, David (eds.). Edward the Elder 899–924. Abingdon, UK: Routledge. pp. 1–11. ISBN 978-0-415-21497-1.
- Higham, Nick (2001b). "Endpiece". In Higham, Nick; Hill, David (eds.). Edward the Elder 899–924. Abingdon, UK: Routledge. pp. 307–311. ISBN 978-0-415-21497-1.
- Insley, Charles (2009). "Southumbria". In Stafford, Pauline (ed.). A Companion to the Early Middle Ages: Britain and Ireland c. 500 – c. 1100. Chichester, UK: Wiley-Blackwell. pp. 322–340. ISBN 978-1-118-42513-8.
- Kelly, S. E., ed. (2000). Charters of Abingdon Abbey Part 1. Oxford, UK: Oxford University Press. ISBN 978-0-19-726217-7.
- Keynes, Simon; Lapidge, Michael, eds. (1983). Alfred the Great: Asser's Life of King Alfred & Other Contemporary Sources. London, UK: Penguin Classics. ISBN 978-0-14-044409-4.
- Keynes, Simon (1998). "King Alfred and the Mercians". In Blackburn, M. A. S.; Dumville, D. N. (eds.). Kings, Currency and Alliances: History and Coinage of Southern England in the Ninth Century. Woodbridge, UK: Boydell Press. pp. 1–45. ISBN 978-0-85115-598-2.
- Keynes, Simon (1999). "England, c. 900–1016". In Reuter, Timothy (ed.). The New Cambridge Medieval History. Vol. III. Cambridge, UK: Cambridge University Press. pp. 456–484. ISBN 978-0-521-36447-8.
- Keynes, Simon (2001). "Edward, King of the Anglo-Saxons". In Higham, N. J.; Hill, D. H. (eds.). Edward the Elder 899–924. Abingdon, UK: Routledge. pp. 40–66. ISBN 978-0-415-21497-1.
- Lapidge, Michael (1993). Anglo-Latin Literature 900–1066. London, UK: The Hambledon Press. ISBN 978-1-85285-012-8.
- Lyon, Stewart (2001). "The coinage of Edward the Elder". In Higham, Nick; Hill, David (eds.). Edward the Elder 899–924. Abingdon, UK: Routledge. pp. 67–78. ISBN 978-0-415-21497-1.
- Meijns, Brigitte (2010). "The Policy on Relic Translations of Baldwin II of Flanders (879–918), Edward of Wessex (899–924), and Æthelflæd of Mercia (d. 924): A Key to Anglo-Flemish Relations". In Rollason, David; Leyser, Conrad; Williams, Hannah (eds.). England and the Continent in the Tenth Century. Turnhout, Belgium: Brepols. pp. 473–492. ISBN 978-2-503-53208-0.
- Miller, Sean (2011). "Edward [called Edward the Elder] (870s?–924), king of the Anglo-Saxons". Oxford Dictionary of National Biography. Oxford University Press. doi:10.1093/ref:odnb/8514. (subscription, Wikipedia Library access or UK public library membership required)
- Ryan, Martin J. (2013). "Conquest, Reform and the Making of England". In Higham, Nicholas J.; Ryan, Martin J. (eds.). The Anglo-Saxon World. New Haven, Connecticut: Yale University Press. pp. 284–322. ISBN 978-0-300-12534-4.
- Sawyer, Peter, ed. (1979). Charters of Burton Abbey. Oxford, UK: Oxford University Press. ISBN 978-0-19-725940-5.
- Stafford, Pauline (1981). "The King's Wife in Wessex 800–1066". Past and Present (91). Oxford, UK: 3–27. doi:10.1093/past/91.1.3. ISSN 0031-2746.
- Stafford, Pauline (2001). "Political Women in Mercia, Eighth to Early Tenth Centuries". In Brown, Michelle P.; Farr, Carol A. (eds.). Mercia: An Anglo-Saxon Kingdom in Europe. London, UK: Leicester University Press. pp. 35–49. ISBN 978-0-7185-0231-7.
- Stafford, Pauline (2007). "'The Annals of Æthelflæd': Annals, History and Politics in Early Tenth-Century England". In Barrow, Julia; Wareham, Andrew (eds.). Myth, Rulership, Church and Charters. Aldershot, UK: Ashgate. pp. 101–116. ISBN 978-0-7546-5120-8.
- Stenton, Frank (1971). Anglo-Saxon England (3rd ed.). Oxford, UK: Oxford University Press. ISBN 978-0-19-280139-5.
- Thacker, Alan (1985). "Kings, Saints and Monasteries in Pre-Viking Mercia". Midland History. X: 1–25. doi:10.1179/mdh.1985.10.1.1. ISSN 1756-381X.
- Thacker, Alan (2001). "Dynastic Monasteries and Family Cults". In Higham, N. J.; Hill, D. H. (eds.). Edward the Elder 899–924. Abingdon, UK: Routledge. pp. 248–263. ISBN 978-0-415-21497-1.
- Thacker, Alan (2014). "Chester". In Lapidge, Michael; Blair, John; Keynes, Simon; Scragg, Donald (eds.). The Wiley Blackwell Encyclopaedia of Anglo-Saxon England (2nd ed.). Chichester, UK: Wiley Blackwell. pp. 104–106. ISBN 978-0-631-22492-1.
- Thompson, Victoria (2004). Dying and Death in Later Anglo-Saxon England. Woodbridge, UK: The Boydell Press. ISBN 978-1-84383-070-2.
- Wainwright, F. T. (1975). Scandinavian England: Collected Papers. Chichester, UK: Phillimore. ISBN 978-0-900592-65-2.
- Walker, Ian W. (2000). Mercia and the Making of England. Stroud, UK: Sutton Publishing. ISBN 978-0-7509-2131-2.
- Ward, Simon (2001). "Edward the Elder and the Re-establishment of Chester". In Higham, N. J.; Hill, D. H. (eds.). Edward the Elder 899–924. Abingdon, UK: Routledge. pp. 160–166. ISBN 978-0-415-21497-1.
- Williams, Ann (1991a). "Æthelred Lord of the Mercians c. 883–911". In Williams, Ann; Smyth, Alfred P.; Kirby, D. P. (eds.). A Biographical Dictionary of Dark Age Britain. London, UK: Seaby. p. 27. ISBN 978-1-85264-047-7.
- Williams, Ann (1991b). "Burgred, King of Mercia 852–74". In Williams, Ann; Smyth, Alfred P.; Kirby, D. P. (eds.). A Biographical Dictionary of Dark Age Britain. London, UK: Seaby. pp. 68–69. ISBN 978-1-85264-047-7.
- Williams, Ann (1991c). "Ceolwulf II, King of Mercia 874–9". In Williams, Ann; Smyth, Alfred P.; Kirby, D. P. (eds.). A Biographical Dictionary of Dark Age Britain. London, UK: Seaby. p. 78. ISBN 978-1-85264-047-7.
- Woolf, Alex (2001). "View from the West: an Irish Perspective". In Higham, N. J.; Hill, D. H. (eds.). Edward the Elder 899–924. Abingdon, UK: Routledge. pp. 89–101. ISBN 978-0-415-21497-1.
- Woolf, Alex (2007). From Pictland to Alba: 789–1070. Edinburgh, UK: Edinburgh University Press. ISBN 978-0-7486-1233-8.

Titles of nobility
Preceded by Æthelred II; Lord of the Mercians	Lady of the Mercians; 911–918	Succeeded by Ælfwynn
