= St Oswald's Priory, Gloucester =

Grade I listed priory in Gloucester, Gloucestershire, England

Coordinates: 51.8694°N 2.2478°W

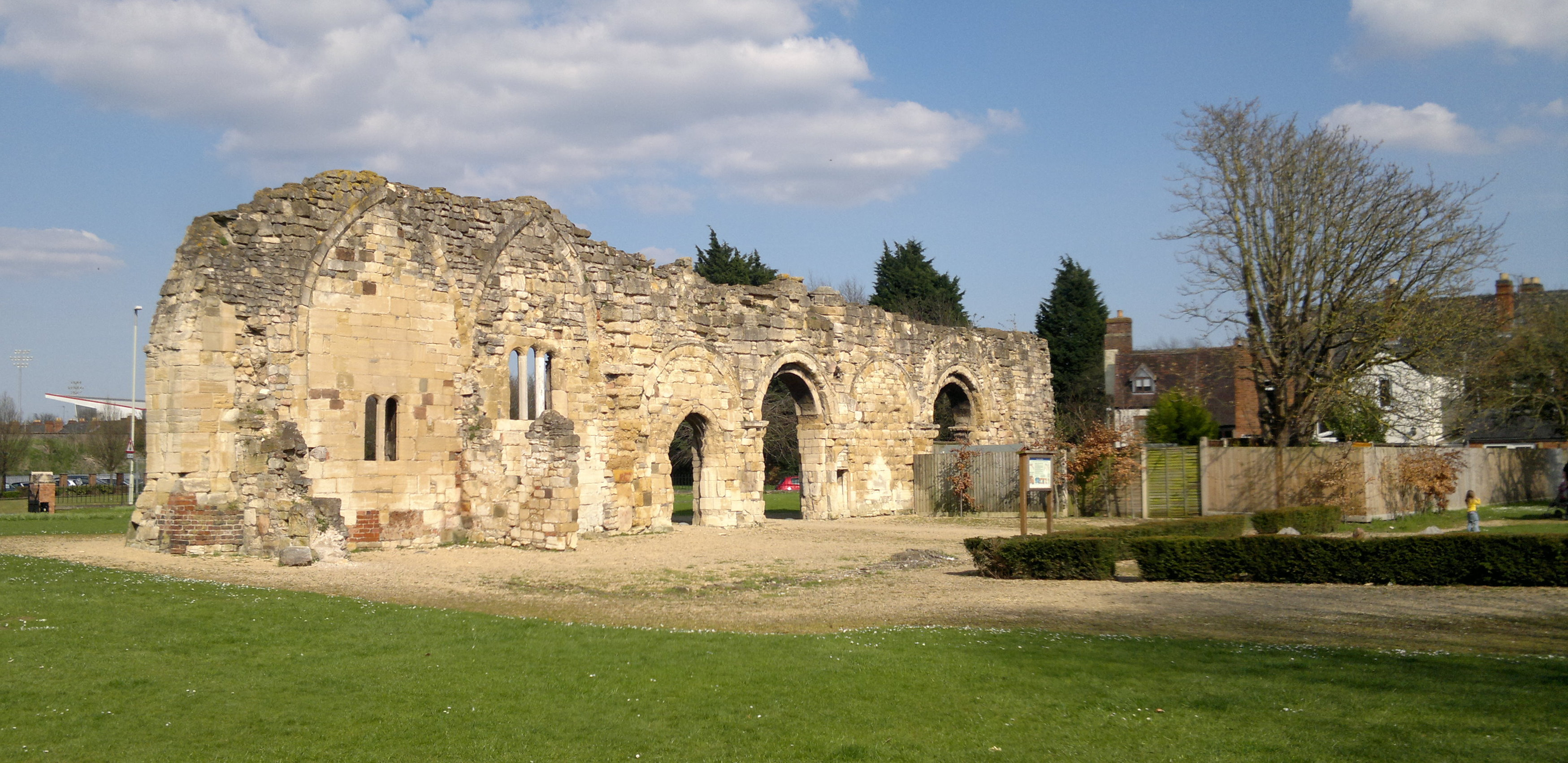
View of the ruins of the Priory from the south side.

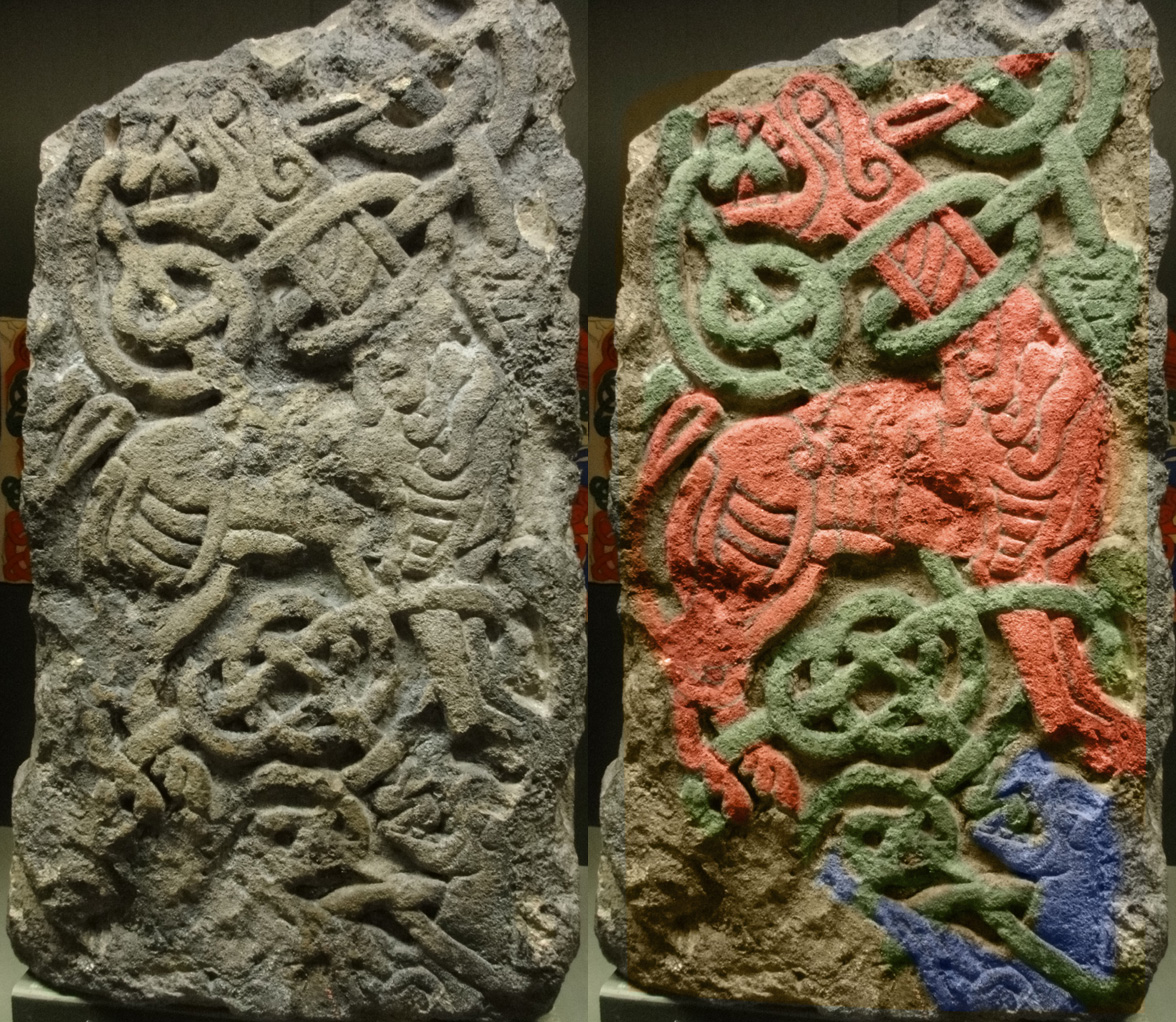
A 9th-century Anglo-Saxon cross found at the Priory, now in Gloucester City Museum & Art Gallery. (Painted replica on right).

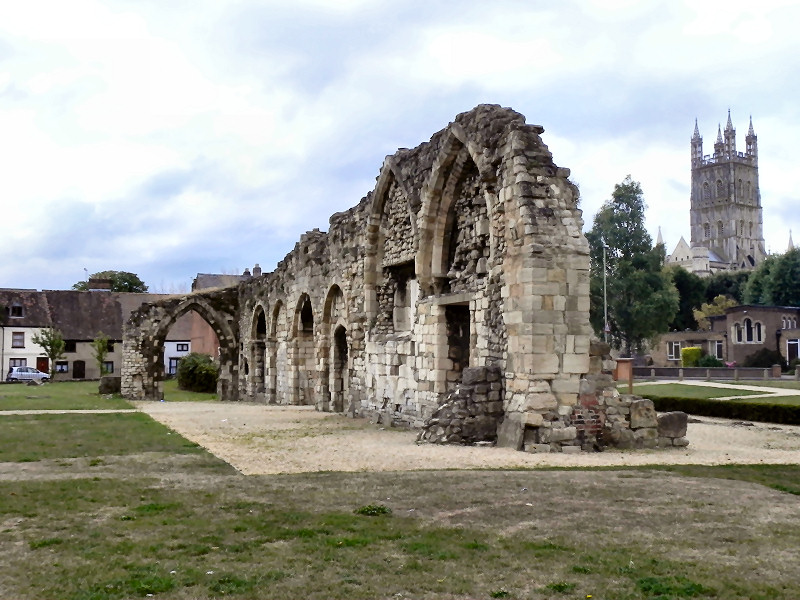
The north side of the Priory.

St Oswald's Priory was founded by Æthelflæd, daughter of Alfred the Great, and her husband Æthelred, ealdorman of Mercia, in the late 880s or the 890s. It appears to have been an exact copy of the Old Minster, Winchester Its ruins are a Grade I listed building.

The site was an important part of the Burh of Gloucester and was supported by the ruling family of the time including king Æthelstan. From the 11th century its importance declined, becoming a minor house of Canons regular until suppression in 1536. The building was damaged during the English Civil War and largely demolished in 1643.

== History ==
=== Foundation ===
St Peter's Abbey had been founded in Gloucester about 679 by Osric, ruler of the Hwicce, and at the end of the ninth century Æthelred, Lord of the Mercians and his wife Æthelflæd, daughter of King Alfred the Great, founded a new minster at a different location in Gloucester, also initially dedicated to St Peter. In 909 a combined West Saxon and Mercian raid into Danish territory resulted in the translation of some of the bones of St Oswald to the new church from Bardney Abbey in Lincolnshire, and the priory was renamed St Oswald's in his honour.

=== Royal favour ===
St Oswald's, founded when Gloucester was an important new burh, at first enjoyed royal favour, and both Æthelflæd and Æthelred were buried there. Æthelflæd's nephew, the future King Æthelstan, was brought up at their court, and according to a charter only preserved in a transcript dating from 1304, in 925 Æthelstan granted privileges to St Oswald's "according to a pact of paternal piety which formerly he pledged with Æthelred". Æthelstan was a major benefactor of St Oswald's, and he may have commissioned grave covers for the tombs of Æthelflæd and Æthelred. Prior to the building of the new St Peter's Abbey in 1089, St Oswald's was the major destination of pilgrims journeying to Gloucester.

=== Decline ===
The priory soon declined into obscurity. Late in the reign of King Cnut its estates were used as an endowment for a royal clerk. In 1089 Serlo, the Norman abbot of the original St Peter's, began an ambitious new church (later Gloucester Cathedral) to replace the old minster, and St Oswald's, its emoluments much reduced, became a minor house of Augustinian canons. The monastery was suppressed in 1536, and became the parish church of St Catherine, but this was destroyed in a Civil War siege in 1643.

== Legacy ==
Currently the priory is a Grade I listed building.

Items from the priory are in Gloucester City Museum & Art Gallery.

== Burials ==
- Æthelflæd, Lady of the Mercians
- Æthelred, Lord of the Mercians

== See also ==
- List of monastic houses in Gloucestershire

== Sources ==
- Blair, John; Rippon, Stephen; Smart, Christopher (2020). Planning in the Early Medieval Landscape. Liverpool, UK: Liverpool University Press. ISBN 978-1-78962-116-7.
- Foot, Sarah (2011). Æthelstan: The First King of England. New Haven and London: Yale University Press. ISBN 978-0-300-12535-1.
- Heighway, Carolyn (2001). "Gloucester and the new minster of St Oswald". In Higham, N. J.; Hill, D. H. (eds.). Edward the Elder 899-924. Routledge. ISBN 0-415-21497-1.
- Karkov, Catherine E. (2004). The Ruler Portraits of Anglo-Saxon England. The Boydell Press. ISBN 1-84383-059-0.
- Historic England. "St Oswalds Priory (1119912)". Research records (formerly PastScape).
- "St Oswald's Priory, Gloucester". British Listed Buildings.
