= S. Fowler Wright =

British writer and editor (1874–1965)

Sydney Fowler Wright
- Born: 6 January 1874; Holly Street, Smethwick, England
- Died: 25 February 1965 (aged 91)
- Occupations: Writer, editor, poet
- Writing career
- Genres: science fiction, mystery fiction, poetry

Sydney Fowler Wright (6 January 1874 – 25 February 1965) was a British editor, poet, science fiction author, writer of screenplays, mystery fiction and works in other genres, as well as being an accountant and a conservative political activist. He also wrote as Sydney Fowler and Anthony Wingrave.

== Background ==
Wright was born in Holly Street, Smethwick (then in the Kings Norton registration district), England on 6 January 1874. Wright quit school at eleven, and spent his adolescence studying literature when not working. From a young age, Wright deliberately adopted a healthy lifestyle; he did not smoke or eat meat, and rarely drank alcohol. Wright also exercised regularly by hiking or cycling in the countryside.

He was married twice. His first wife was Nellie (Julia Ellen) Ashbarry, whom he married in 1895. After Nellie's death in 1918, Wright married Truda (Anastasia Gertruda) Hancock in 1920. Wright had ten children.

== Writing career ==
In 1917, Wright helped found the Empire Poetry League and edited the League's journal, Poetry. Wright used Poetry to publish his translations of Dante's Inferno and Purgatorio.

Wright began writing science fiction during the 1920s. The book Science-Fiction: The Early Years describes Wright as "the major British writer of genre science fiction between Wells and the moderns". His first science fiction novel was The Amphibians (1924), set in a future where humanity has been succeeded by the titular beings. His 1928 novel Deluge, about a flood which devastates Britain, was a success and was later adapted into a Hollywood movie of the same name. The Island of Captain Sparrow (1928) was inspired by H. G. Wells' The Island of Doctor Moreau. Wright's novel features a race of satyr-like beast men persecuted by humans.

Wright was critical of modern industrial civilization, and his 1932 collection The New Gods Lead contained several stories attacking trends Wright disagreed with, including birth control and the motor car (The "New Gods" of the book's title were described by Wright as Comfort and Cowardice). The New Gods Lead includes several stories of note, including "The Rat", about a doctor who discovers an immortality serum, and "P.N. 40", which is set in a repressive future controlled by supporters of eugenics. "The Choice:An Allegory of Blood and Tears" is a satire on the Christian conception of Heaven.

In 1934, Wright visited Nazi Germany to write a series of newspaper articles. Alarmed at what he saw, he wrote three novels about a future war in Europe: Prelude in Prague: The War of 1938, Four Days' War, and Mediggo's Ridge.

== Works ==
=== Science fiction novels ===
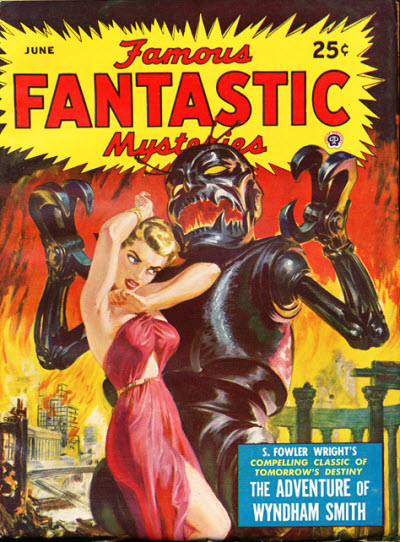
The Adventure of Wyndham Smith was reprinted in the June 1950 issue of Famous Fantastic Mysteries

==== Amphibians sequence ====
- The Amphibians (1924)
- The World Below (1929) [sequel to The Amphibians]

==== Deluge and Dawn sequence ====
- Deluge (1928)
- Dawn (1929) [parallel and sequel to Deluge]

==== Marguerite Cranleigh series ====
- Dream, or the Simian Maid (1931) [first novel in the Marguerite Cranleigh Series]
- The Vengeance of Gwa (1935) [second novel in the Marguerite Cranleigh Series]
- Spiders' War (1954) [third novel in the Marguerite Cranleigh Series]

==== Future War series ====
- Prelude in Prague: The War of 1938 (1934)
- Four Days War (1936) [sequel to Prelude in Prague]
- Megiddo's Ridge (1937) [sequel to Four Days War]

==== Other science fiction novels ====
- The Island of Captain Sparrow (1928)
- Beyond the Rim (1932)
- Power (1933)
- The Screaming Lake (1937)
- The Hidden Tribe (1938)
- The Adventure of Wyndham Smith (1938)
- The Adventure of the Blue Room (as Sydney Fowler) (1945)

=== Historical novels ===
- Elfwin (1930) (Novel about Ethelfleda of Mercia)
- Lord's Right in Languedoc (1933)
- David (1934)
- Last Days of Pompeii (1948) (Redaction of Lord Lytton's novel by S.F.W.).
- Marguerite de Valois (1946) (Translation of Alexander Dumas père novel).
- The Siege of Malta, Part One: St Elmo (1942)
- The Siege of Malta, Part Two: St Angelo (1942) (Completion of Walter Scott's unfinished novel)

=== Mystery novels (as Sydney Fowler) ===
- The King against Anne Bickerton (1930, vts REX v Anne Bickerton and The Case of Anne Bickerton)
- By Saturday (1931)
- The Bell Street Murders (1931)
- Crime & co. (1931, vt The Hand-Print Mystery)
- Who Else But She? (1934, vts Cherchez la Femme, and Who But She?)
- Was Murder Done? (1936)
- The Attic Murder (1936)
- Post-Mortem Evidence (1936)
- Four Callers in Razor Street (1937)
- The Jordans Murder (1938) (Reprinted in abridged edition in 1941)
- The Murder in Bethnal Square (1938)
- The Wills of Jane Kanwhistle (1939)
- The Secret of the Screen (1940)
- The Hanging of Constance Hillier (1941)
- The Rissole Mystery (1941)
- A Bout with the Mildew Gang (1941)
- Second Bout with the Mildew Gang (1942)
- Dinner in New York (1943)
- The End of the Mildew Gang (1944)
- Too Much for Mr. Jellipot (1945)
- Who Murdered Reynard? (1947)
- With Cause enough? (1954)

=== Other novels ===
- Seven Thousand in Israel (1931)
- Red Ike (1931, vt. Under The Brutchstone, Redaction of J.M. Denwood's novel Cumberland).
- Ordeal of Barata (1939)

=== Short fiction ===
- "Automata: I" (1929)
- "Automata: II" (1929)
- "Automata: III" (1929)
- "P.N. 40" (1929)
- "The Rat" (1929)
- "Automata" (1929)
- "Brain" (1932)
- "Choice" (1932)
- "The Rule" (1932)
- "Proof" (1932)
- "Appeal" (1932)
- "This Night" (1932)
- "Justice" (1932)
- "Original Sin" (1946)
- "The Terror of William Stickers" (1946)
- "A Question of E.D.D." (1946)
- "The Congo Cat" (1946)
- "The Temperature of Gehenna Sue" (1946)
- "Carrots" (1946)
- "Burglar's Aid" (1946)
- "Who Else But She?" (1946)
- "Status" (1946)
- "The Witchfinder" (1946)
- "Obviously Suicide" (1951)
- "The Better Choice" (1955)

=== Collections ===
- Scenes from the Morte d'Arthur (1919) as Alan Seymour
- The New Gods Lead (1932)
- The Witchfinder (1946)
- The Throne of Saturn (1949)
- S. Fowler Wright's Short Stories (1996) ISBN 1-900848-00-7.

=== Non-fiction ===
- Police and Public (1929)
- The Life of Sir Walter Scott – Part I (1932)
- The Life of Sir Walter Scott – Part II (1932)
- Should We Surrender Colonies? (1938)
