= Brigitte Meijns =

- Education: Medieval history
- Alma mater: Katholieke Universiteit Leuven
- Scientific career
- Fields: Church history
- Institutions: Katholieke Universiteit Leuven
- Thesis: Aken of Jeruzalem? De ordo canonicus in het graafschap Vlaanderen: een onderzoek naar het ontstaan en de hervorming van de kanonikale instellingen (Merovingische periode - circa 1155) (1999)
- Website: www.arts.kuleuven.be/middeleeuwen/english/staff/00010002

Brigitte Leonie Isabelle Meijns is a Belgian medievalist, professor of Medieval History at the Katholieke Universiteit Leuven.

Meijns studied at the Katholieke Universiteit Leuven and the University of Poitiers, obtaining her doctorate from Leuven in 1999 with a thesis on the reform of chapters of canons regular in the 11th and 12th centuries. This was published as Aken of Jeruzalem? Het ontstaan en de hervorming van de kanonikale instellingen in Vlaanderen tot circa 1155 (Leuven, 2000).

Her work examines the role of collegiate churches in the medieval Low Countries, the local impact of Gregorian Reform, and the uses and exchange of relics.

She was a visiting scholar at the École Pratique des Hautes Études in Paris in 2008, and at the Institute for Advanced Study in spring 2009.

She currently teaches History of the Middle Ages and Religion in the Middle Ages (and formerly Post-Classical Latin Historical Texts) at KU Leuven.
