= The Throne of Saturn (short story collection) =

- Jacket illustration by Ronald Clyne for The Throne of Saturn by S. Fowler Wright
- Author: S. Fowler Wright
- Cover artist: Ronald Clyne
- Language: English
- Genre: Science fiction
- Publisher: Arkham House
- Publication date: 1949
- Publication place: United States
- Media type: Print (hardback)
- Pages: viii, 186 pp

The Throne of Saturn is a collection of science fiction short stories by British author S. Fowler Wright. It was released in 1949 and was the author's first American book and his only collection published by Arkham House. It was released in an edition of 3,062 copies.

The book is an expansion of The New Gods Lead published by Jarrolds in 1932 by the addition of two stories.

== Contents ==
The Throne of Saturn contains these twelve stories, as well as a foreword:

1. "Justice"
2. "This Night"
3. "Brain"
4. "Appeal"
5. "Proof"
6. "P.N. 40"
7. "Automata"
8. "The Rat"
9. "Rule"
10. "Choice"
11. "The Temperature of Gehenna Sue"
12. "Original Sin"

== Reception ==
Boucher and McComas described the 1949 edition as "twelve superb short stories of a future in which the new gods have led man into strange scientific and sociological bypaths -- a book it would be difficult to overpraise." P. Schuyler Miller praised the collection as "imaginative fiction entirely different from anything else you are likely to find in print." An article by "R.K." in The Age called the work "an illustration of a keen, vivid imagination".

== Reprints ==
- London: Heinemann, 1951.
