= Empire Poetry League =

The Empire Poetry League was a British-based organisation founded in 1917, with an effective existence of about 15 years. Initially having a patriotic impetus, and counting a number of leading literary figures among its supporters — G. K. Chesterton, Humbert Wolfe, L. A. G. Strong and the novelists H. E. Bates and A. G. Street (1892–1966) — as members, it shortly became a vehicle for Sydney Fowler Wright (1874–1965), now remembered mainly for his genre fiction.

The League, through Fowler's small press, the Merton Press, was active in the 1920s in producing anthologies of regional verse of the United Kingdom, usually tied to a single county. It also, true to its name, published early collections from elsewhere in the British Empire: a 1921 anthology Voices From Summerland compiled by J. E. Clare McFarlane in Jamaica, and a series of Dominion and Colonial Verse collections. The League's magazine, Poetry and the Play (initially Poetry), ran from 1917 to 1932, when the League foundered. The Jamaica Poetry Society, formally a branch, persisted into the 1950s.

The work of the League in publishing new poets made few reputations, and Wright was outspoken against free verse. The most clear exception, to both of those, was the way in which Wright championed Olaf Stapledon from 1923; though some have discounted this as more tactical than convinced on Wright's part.

== Merton Press ==
- Poets of Merseyside - an Anthology of Today (1923)
- Birmingham Poetry 1923-4 (1924)
- A Somerset Anthology of Modern Verse (1924)
- Some Yorkshire Poets. An Anthology of To-Day (1925)
- The County Series of Contemporary Poetry I Warwickshire (1925)

== Fowler Wright Press ==
- Sussex Song, an Anthology of Contemporary Sussex Poetry (1927)
- London Pride (1927)
- Contemporary East-Anglian Poetry (1928)
- Hampshire Poetry (1928)
- Wessex Song. An Anthology of Contemporary Dorsetshire and Wiltshire Poetry (1928)
- Contemporary Lancashire Poetry (1928)
- Some Scottish verse: an anthology of contemporary Scottish poetry (1928)
