= Osbert of Clare =

12th-century monk

Osbert of Clare (also Osbert de Westminster; died in or after 1158) was a monk, elected prior of Westminster Abbey and briefly abbot. He was a prolific writer of letters, and hagiographer.

== Life ==
Osbert was born towards the end of the eleventh century at Clare, Suffolk. He became a Benedictine monk at a priory located in Clare Castle. In 1090 Gilbert Fitz Richard gave the church in the castle to the Abbey of Our Lady of Bec in Normandy, making it an alien priory and a dependency of Bec. In 1124 Gilbert's son, Richard Fitz Gilbert de Clare, moved the Benedictines to a new foundation about two miles west of Clare in Stoke-by-Clare. Under the patronage of the powerful de Clare family, it was one of the wealthiest monastic houses in Norman England.

Osbert was elected prior of St Peter's Abbey, Westminster. In the 1130s, he wrote liturgical texts for the feast of Saint Anne for Worcester Cathedral.

During a vacancy of the See of London, Osbert undertook to introduce at Westminster, the Anglo-Saxon Feast of the Conception of Mary, which had been removed from the liturgical calendar by Lanfranc. A number of monks objected against this since it had not been sanctioned by Rome. Whereupon the matter was brought before the Council of London in 1129. The synod decided in favour of the feast, and Bishop Gilbert of London adopted it for his diocese. Thereafter the feast spread in England, but for a time retained its private character.

Osbert was a friend of Anselm of Canterbury, and had a deep appreciation of Anglo-Saxon saints and spirituality. Among his works is a biography of Eadburh of Winchester, daughter of Edward the Elder and Eadgifu of Kent, and a nun at St Mary's Abbey, Winchester.

== Works ==
By 1138, he had reworked the vita Ædwardi regis of Westminster Abbey. He himself composed a Life of St Eadburh of Winchester for Pershore Abbey and a Life of St Æthelberht of East Anglia, dedicated to Gilbert Foliot sometime after 1148.

- Letters, ed. E.W. Williamson, The letters of Osbert of Clare. Oxford, 1929. Reprinted in 1998.
- Charters, ed. by E. Mason, J. Bray, and D. J. Murphy (eds.). Westminster Abbey charters, 1066–c.1214. RS 25. London, 1988.
- Vita Edburgae, MS. Laud Misc. 114, f. 85–120 (Bodleian, Oxford), ed. S.J. Ridyard, The Royal Saints of Anglo-Saxon England. A Study of West Saxon and East Anglian Cults. Cambridge Studies in Medieval Life and Thought 4. Cambridge, 2008. 253 ff (Appendix).
- Some extracts are printed in Vita Ædwardi regis "The Life of King Edward", ed. and tr. F. Barlow, The Life of King Edward who Rests at Westminster Attributed to a Monk of Saint-Bertin. 2nd ed. Oxford, 1992. The full text was edited by Marc Bloch, "La vie de S. Édouard le Confesseur par Osbert de Clare." Analecta Bollandiana 41 (1923): 5–131;
