= Pershore Abbey =

Coordinates: 52°06′38″N 02°04′40″W

- Abbey Church of Holy Cross with Saint Edburgha
- Church of the Holy Cross
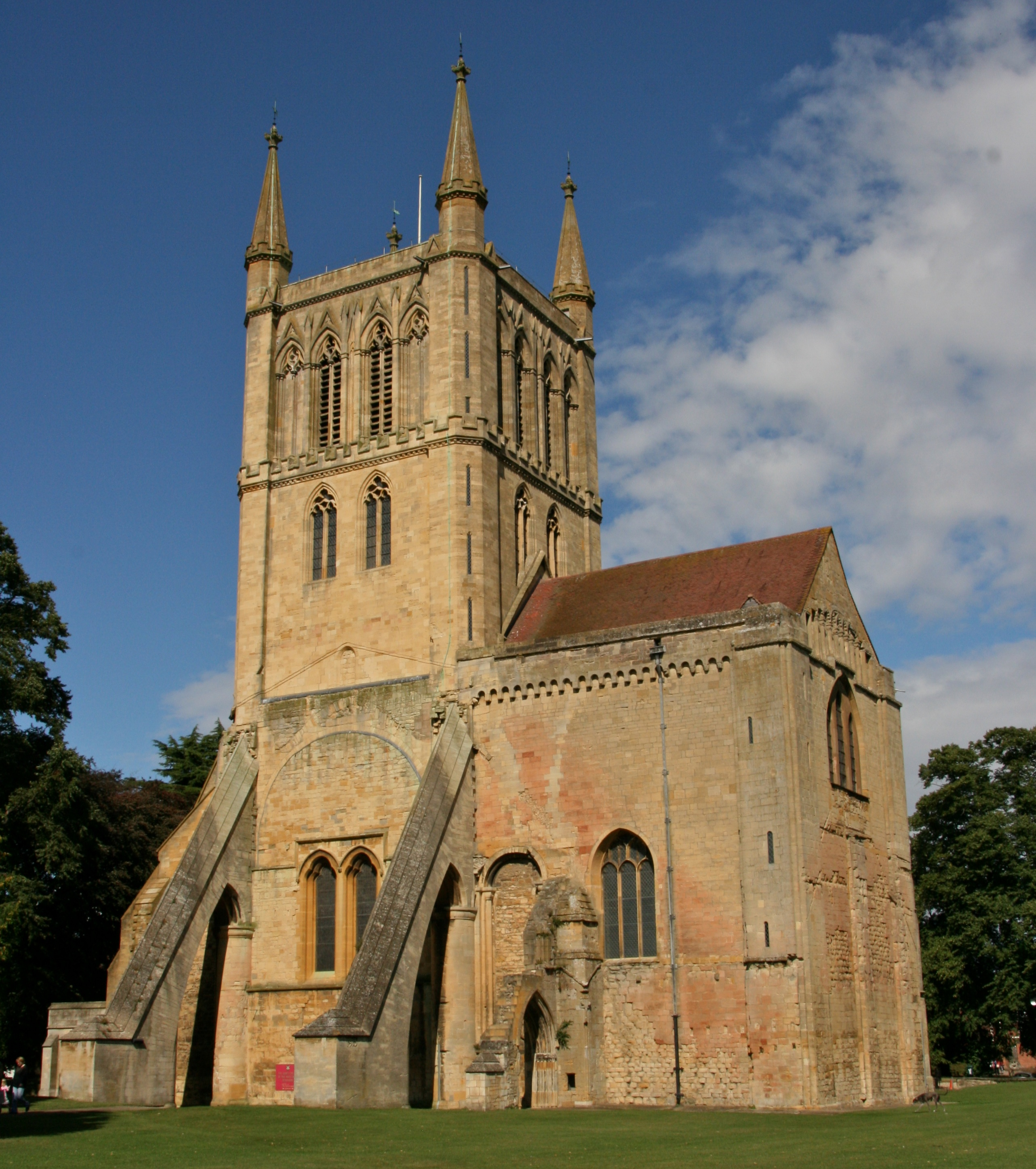
- Pershore Abbey
- Pershore Abbey
- Denomination: Church of England
- Previous denomination: Catholic Church
- Churchmanship: Broad Church
- Website: pershoreabbey.org.uk

History
- Dedication: Holy Cross

Architecture
- Heritage designation: Grade I listed building
- Designated: 11 February 1965
- Style: Romanesque, Gothic

Administration
- Province: Canterbury
- Diocese: Worcester
- Parish: Pershore

Clergy
- Vicar: Claire Lording

Pershore Abbey, at Pershore in Worcestershire, was a Benedictine abbey with Anglo-Saxon origins until the reformation. The remaining part of the abbey church is now a Church of England parish church, the Church of the Holy Cross.

== History ==
=== Foundation ===
The foundation of the minster at Pershore is alluded to in a spurious charter of King Æthelred of Mercia (r. 675–704). It purports to be the charter by which Æthelred granted 300 hides (about 36,000 acres (150 km^{2})) at Gloucester to King Osric of the Hwicce, and another 300 at Pershore to Osric's brother, Oswald. It is preserved only as a copy in a 14th-century register of Gloucester, where it is followed by two charters listing the endowments made to the abbey until the reign of King Burgred (852-874). The 300 hides mentioned here are unlikely to be a contemporary detail, as they were intended to represent the triple hundred which later made up the area of Worcestershire. Historian H. P. R. Finberg suggests that the foundation charter may have been drafted in the 9th century, based on some authentic material. Oswald's foundation of a monastery at Pershore is not stated explicitly in the charter, but the Worcester chronicle Cronica de Anglia, written c. 1150, reports it under the annal for 683, and John Leland, consulting the now lost Annals of Pershore, places the event around 689. Patrick Sims-Williams suggests that the foundation by Oswald may also represent an oral tradition at Pershore, as its archives were probably destroyed in fires of 1002 and again in 1223.

In the 9th century, Pershore comes to light again as a minster under the patronage of Mercian kings. In other charters contained in the Gloucester register, Coenwulf (r. 796–821) and Burgred are recorded as having been patrons of Pershore. A charter of King Edgar refers back to a grant of privileges by Coenwulf at the request of his ealdorman (dux) Beornnoth.

=== Refoundation ===
In the reign of King Edgar (959-975), Pershore reappears as one of the abbeys to be re-established (or restored) under the programme of Benedictine reform. Writing c. 1000, the Ramsey monk Byrhtferth relates that under the auspices of Oswald, bishop of Worcester, seven monasteries were founded in his diocese, notably including Pershore. The first abbot was one Foldbriht, whose name is sufficiently rare to suggest that he may be the same Foldbriht whom Bishop Æthelwold previously installed at Abingdon and used to be a monk of Glastonbury before that time.

The refoundation is what lies behind an exceptionally elaborate charter for Pershore, dated 972, in which King Edgar is presented as granting new lands and privileges as well as confirming old ones, such as the one granted by Coenwulf. The authenticity of this document, however, has been questioned. Simon Keynes in 1980 showed that it belongs to the so-called Orthodoxorum group of charters, so named after the initial word of their proem, which he concluded were forgeries based on a charter of Æthelred II's reign. Since then, Susan Kelly and John Hudson have vindicated the status of some of these charters, including the one for Pershore, which is written in square minuscule characteristic of some of Edgar's charters. More recently, Peter Stokes has brought to light a variant copy of the charter and suggests that two different versions may have been produced around the same time, somewhere between 972 and 1066. A possible scenario is that they were produced to make up for the loss of the original charter(s), perhaps shortly after the fire which is reported to have destroyed the abbey in c. 1002 (see below).

The 12th-century historian William of Malmesbury, who seems unaware of any pre-existing minster, claims that one Æthelweard (Egelwardus), whom he describes as "ealdorman of Dorset", had founded the abbey of Pershore in the time of King Edgar. Similarly, Osbert's Life of Eadburh of Winchester alleges that one Alwardus, who is styled comes and consul, was responsible for the refoundation. Both authors also attribute to him a role in the translation of some of the saint's relics to Pershore. Osbert writes that an abbess of Nunnaminster had sold some relics to Æthelweard (Alwardus), who in turn handed them over for the refoundation of Pershore. Some scholars have identified him with Æthelweard, the well-known chronicler and ealdorman of the western shires. (Note: A tradition at Tewkesbury Abbey, only 10 miles from Pershore, also remembers a royal kinsman called Æthelweard (Haylwardus) as its patron as well as that of Cranborne Abbey (Dorset), of which Tewkesbury was a dependency. The account, which places his floruit in the time of King Æthelred and Dunstan, is recorded in a late chronicle of that house, written in the 15th century, but may very well be based on older sources. This Æthelweard is to be identified with the Æthelweard Mæw whose activities, including the foundation of Cranborne, are attested in sources closer to his day. Historian Jayakumar suggests that he may be the chronicler Æthelweard, ealdorman of the western shires, as both were royal kinsmen and in the Tewkesbury Chronicle, Cranborne is said to have been founded in suo dominio. Ann Williams, however, prefers to see them as separate persons.)

Whatever high-level patronage the foundation may have received, it was not enough to sustain its fortunes for very long. Precisely what happened to Pershore in the later 10th century is poorly documented, but some sources seem to hint that it went into decline during the succession crisis which emerged in the wake of King Edgar's death. William of Malmesbury says that "it, too, like the others, decayed to a pitiful extent, and was reduced by more than a half". According to Leland, the Annals of Pershore hold an earl called Delfer responsible for depriving the abbey of several of its lands. This Delfer has been interpreted as a misreading for Ælfhere (d. 983), ealdorman of Mercia (whom Leland mentions elsewhere). While himself a patron of Ely and Abingdon, Ælfhere was also charged with despoiling reformed monasteries during Edward the Martyr's brief reign (975-978). The targets included houses refounded by Bishop Oswald or Bishop Æthelwold and considerably enriched under the patronage of Æthelstan Half-King's sons, notably Æthelwine, ealdorman of East Anglia. Evesham Abbey, for instance, as later reported by its own chronicle, also claimed to have lost several of its lands in this way, and Winchcombe was disbanded altogether. Æthelwine, in his turn, was remembered at Ely as a despoiler of its lands. Tensions between Ælfhere and Bishop Oswald, whose authorities overlapped, and between Ælfhere and Æthelwine, with whom Oswald maintained a close relationship, are therefore likely to have been the principal cause of the upheaval. Whether a liberty similar to that of Oswaldslow was an extra cause for concern, compromising Ælfhere's authority as ealdorman, cannot be ascertained from the sources.

=== "Second" refoundation ===
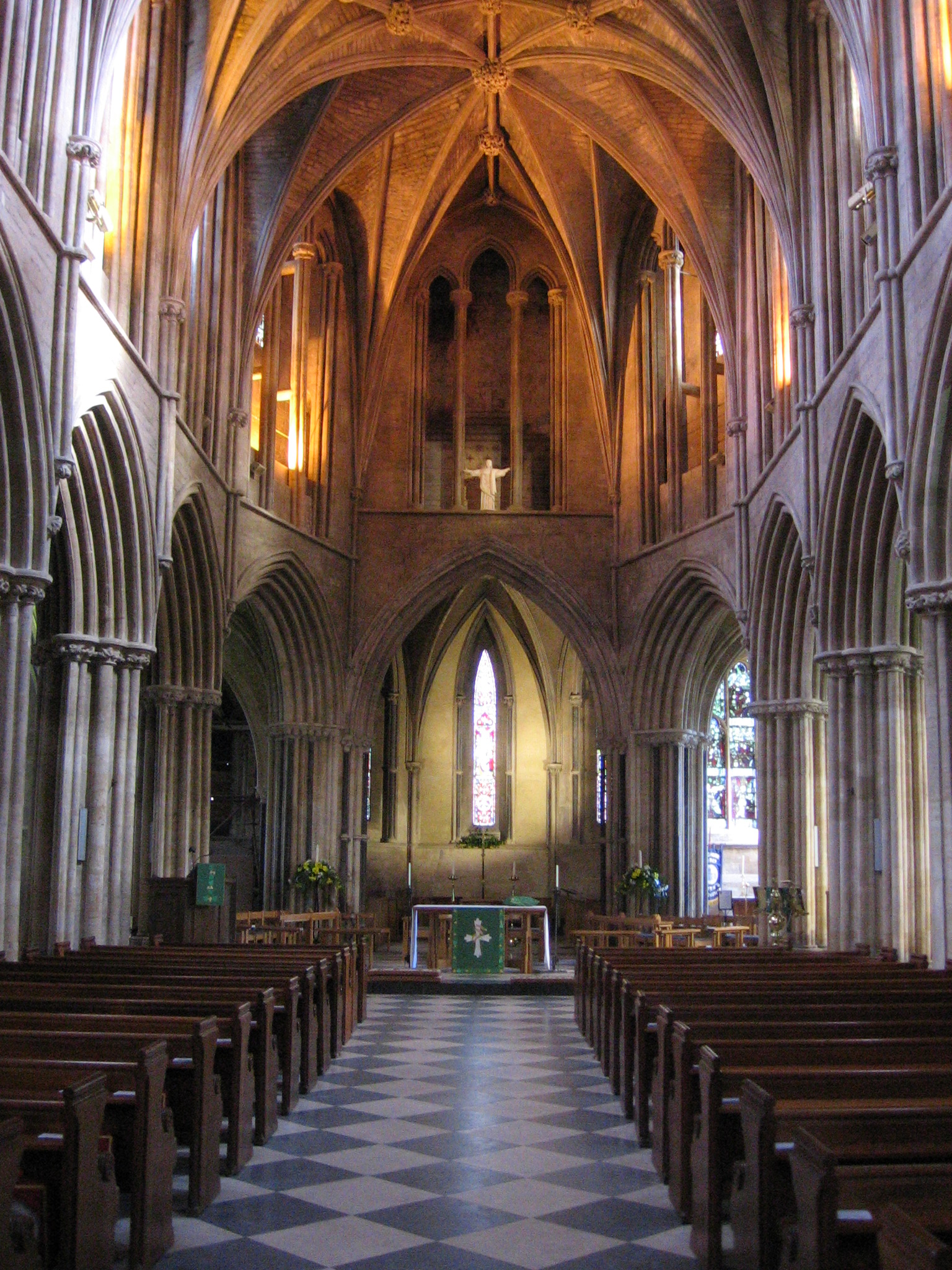
The chancel

Pershore suffered worse misfortune when, according to Leland, it was destroyed by fire and subsequently deserted by the monks, probably in the year 1002. The monastic archives were largely lost in the event, as no original record from before that date survives today. Pershore, however, found a generous patron in the wealthy nobleman Odda of Deerhurst (d. 1056), who restored many of its lands and granted new ones. It has been suggested that he was a kinsman of the ealdorman Æthelweard. The earliest extant record from the archive of Pershore, a charter of 1014 by which King Æthelred granted Mathon (Herefordshire) to ealdorman Leofwine, may testify to Odda's restorations of lands to the house. The monastery was active again by the 1020s, as its abbot Brihtheah was promoted bishop of Worcester in 1033. Odda's brother Ælfric was buried at Pershore in 1053, joined three years later by Odda himself.

In Odda's lifetime the total landed assets of Pershore grew to 300 hides, but after the loss of its benefactor in 1056 about two-thirds were seized and given to Edward the Confessor's new foundation at Westminster. The original single sheet which preserves the fullest version of King Edgar's refoundation charter (though it need not be authentic) is marked by a number of textual alterations and erasures. Some of these changes may suggest a response to the abbey's proprietary struggles.

From the early 12th century there is evidence that Pershore Abbey claimed possession of some of the relics of Saint Eadburh of Winchester, the sainted daughter of King Edward the Elder. Her body was initially buried at Nunnaminster (Winchester), but it was translated in the 960s to a more central spot in Winchester, and again to a shrine in the 970s. Among several possibilities, Susan Ridyard has suggested that the Eadburh whose relics were preserved at Pershore may have been a Mercian saint of that name whose identity had become obscure.

=== Later Middle Ages ===
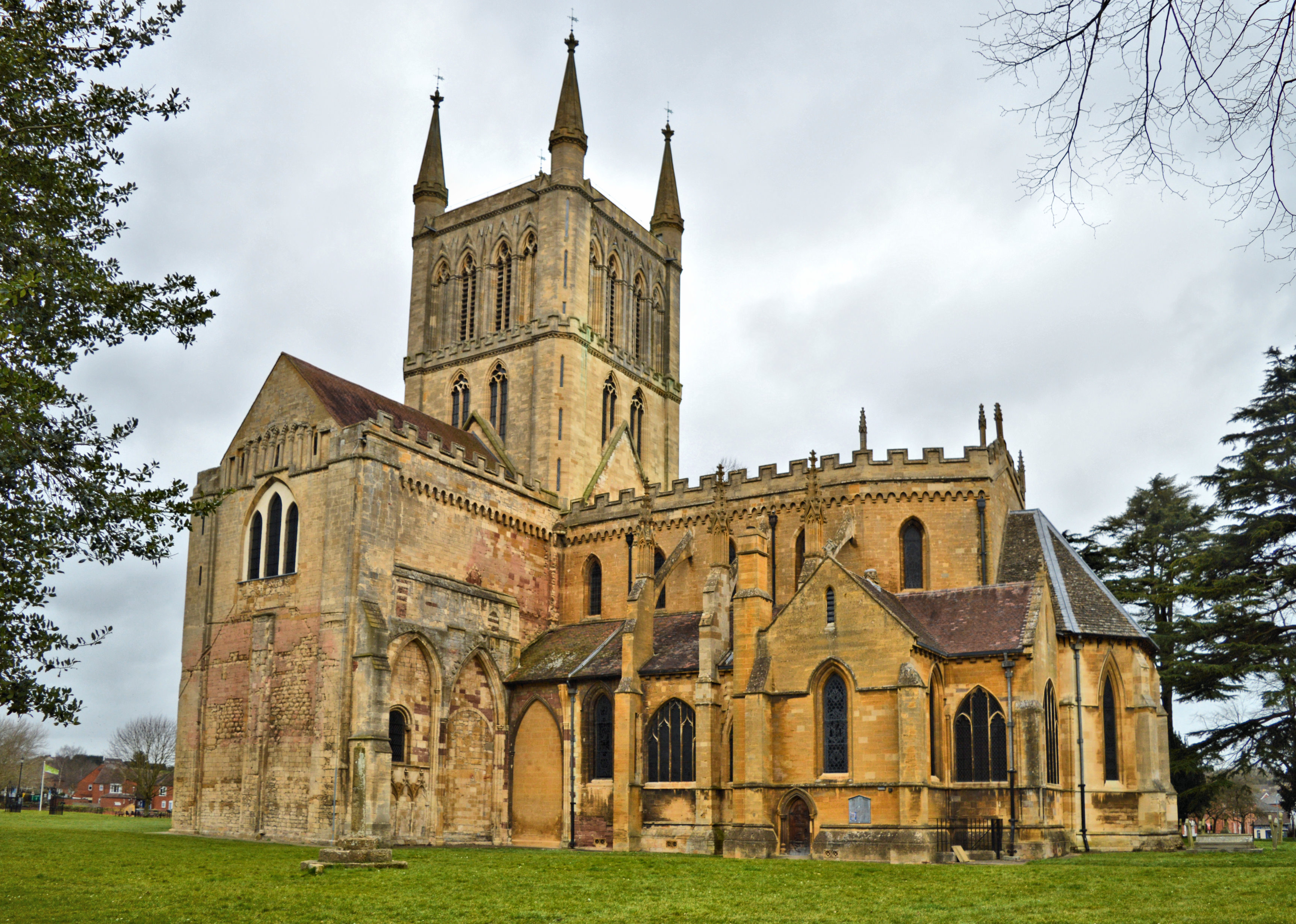
Pershore Abbey from the southeast

The main building was begun in about 1100. In the 14th century it benefited greatly from the generosity of Adam de Harvington, Chancellor of the Exchequer 1327–30, who was a cousin, and, eventually the heir, of the Abbot, William of Harvington. The abbey was dissolved in 1539. A monk of Pershore, named Richard Beerly, was one of those who gave evidence to Thomas Cromwell in 1536 about the misbehaviour of some of his brothers, writing that "Monckes drynk an bowll after collacyon tell ten or xii of the clock, and cum to mattens as dronck as myss, and sume at cardes, sume at dyss." (Note: Wright, Thomas, ed. (September 1843). "LX. Richard Beerly to Cromwell". Three Chapters of Letters Relating to the Suppression of Monasteries. Camden Society Old Series: Volume XXVI. Vol. 26. p. 133. doi:10.1017/S2042169900009135. This is an 1843 edition of original MSS in the British Museum (see also Front cover). See also "Mouse, n. 2". Oxford English Dictionary. Vol. X (online 2nd ed.). 1989., which cites this passage as Lett. Suppress. Monast. (Camden) 133.) (Monks drink a bowl after collation (Note: The term 'collation' in this context refers to the practice in Benedictine monasteries, such as Pershore, of reading extracts from John Cassian's Collationes patrum in Scetica eremo in the hours between the evening meal following Vespers, and before Compline. This was according to Chapter 42 of the Rule of Saint Benedict written in the 6th century. All meals were to be eaten in daylight. By the 9th century the strict rules about fasting had become more relaxed, and the term 'collation' became more generally associated with the indulgence of a light meal, especially on fast days.) until ten or twelve o'clock, and come to Matins as drunk as mice, some [playing] at cards, some at dice.) (Note: Since collation took place in the evening before Compline, and Matins finished at dawn (see Canonical hours), it appears the monks were drinking all night long.)

Pershore Abbey church was partly demolished after the reformation when it was surrendered to the King's Commissioners in 1540; only the tower, choir, and south transept remain. The abbey church remained in use as a parish church. When the north transept collapsed in 1686, a wall was built in its place. Further alterations were carried out, including a restoration by George Gilbert Scott in 1862–64. Scott removed the belfry floor and opened up the lantern tower, exposing the internal tracery which he thought the best in England after that at Lincoln Cathedral. The tower pinnacles were added in 1871. In 1913, two western flying buttresses were added to replace the support from the missing portion of the building.

== Current structure and features ==
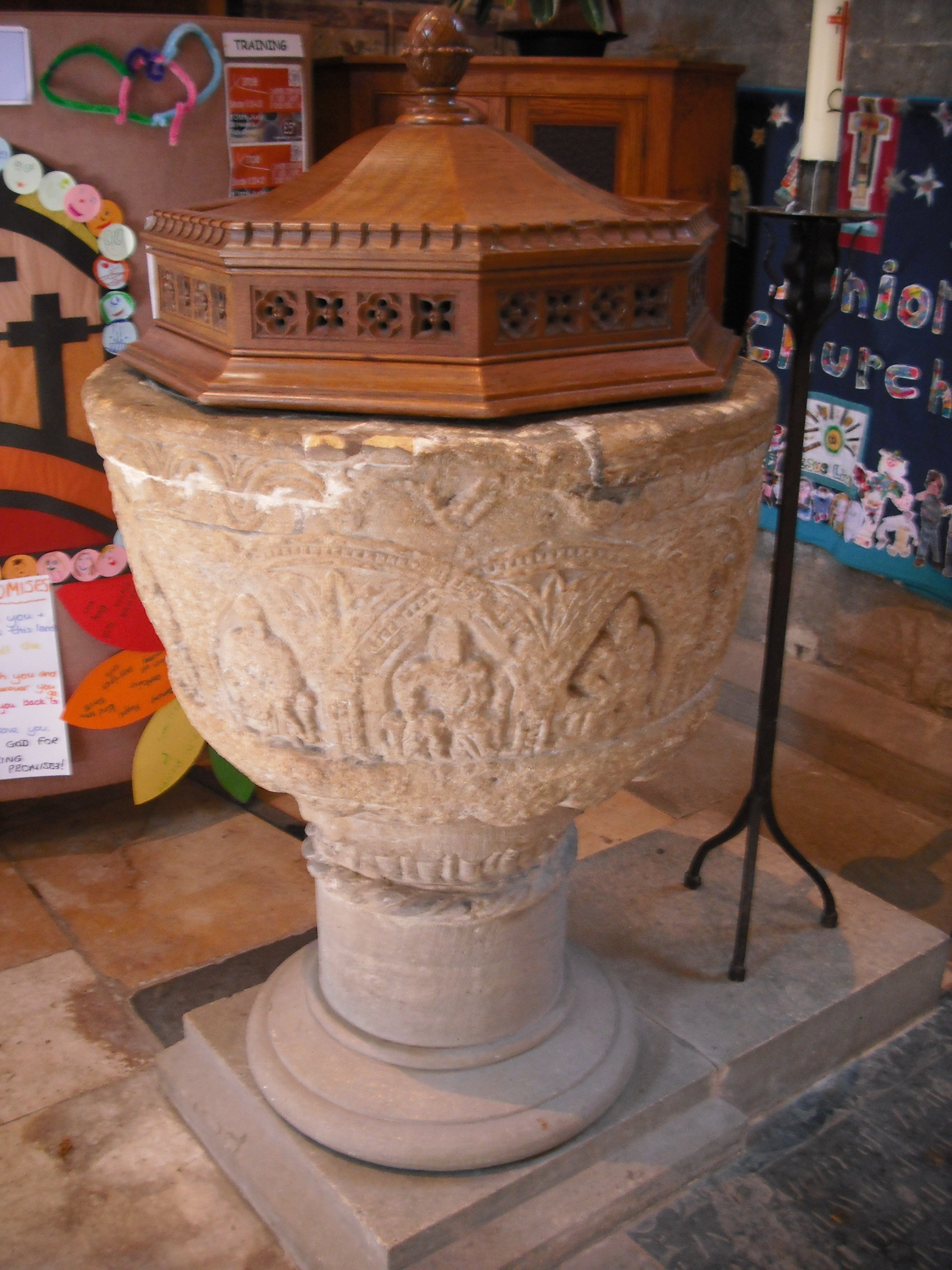
Norman baptismal font

The church as it now stands represents only a small portion of the original building. It is a Grade I listed building. Repairs in 1994 stabilised the south transept, strengthened its roof and repointed the tower and pinnacles. An underfloor heating system was also installed.

=== Bells ===
Pershore Abbey has a ring of eight bells, of which six were cast by the younger Abraham Rudhall in 1729. The treble was cast in 1814 by Thomas Mears of the Whitechapel Bell Foundry. The cracked 4th (also 1729 by Rudhall) was recast by J. Barwell & Sons of Birmingham with "moderate success" in 1897, the same year they were rehung. The largest bell (the tenor) is estimated to weigh 25½ cwt (2856 lbs.) and sounds the note D.

The ringing room, devised as part of Gilbert Scott's 1862-64 restorations, is a metal 'cage' suspended high above the chancel crossing; it is accessed by means of two stone spiral staircases, a walkway through the roof, a squeeze through a narrow passage and a see-through iron staircase.

The bells have the following inscriptions (in capital letters).

1. (Treble) "Joseph Martin and Thomas Evans churchwardens 1814"
2. "Peace and good neighbourhood"
3. "Abr Rudhall of Gloucester cast all of us"
4. "Barwell Founder Birmingham. Prosperity to the Church of England 1729 Recast 1897" (Note: The original inscription read simply "Prosperity to the Church of England".)
5. "Prosperity to all our benefactors A R 1729"
6. "Walter Marriott and Edmund Gale churchwardens A R 1729"
7. "Richard Roberts Esq John Yeend and Thomas Ashfield Gent[leme]n trustees A R 1729"
8. (Tenor) "I to the Church the living call: And to the grave do summon all"

=== Font ===
In about 1840 the abbey was given a new baptismal font. The original Norman font was removed to the churchyard where it served as a cattle trough, and later as a garden ornament. In 1912 a war memorial was erected on the site of the Victorian font and the old font was re-instated, on a pedestal designed by Harold Brakspear. The font is decorated with an interlacing arcade, in the panels of which are the figures of Christ and his Apostles.

== Abbots ==
| Name | In office | Comments |
|---|---|---|
| Foldbriht | c. 970 – 988 | |
| Brihtheah (Brihteah) | ? – 1033 | Nephew of Wulfstan I, Archbishop of York; went on to become bishop of Worcester (1033–8) |
| Ælfric | ? | fl. 1046 x 1050. |
| Edmund | 1058–1085 | d. 1085. |
| Thurstan | 1085–1087 | Master of Gloucester. |
| Hugh | ? | Died before 1113. |
| Guy | ? – 1102 ? – 1136/7 | Deposed in 1102, but later restored to office. |
| William | 1138 – ? | Master of Eye. |
| Thomas | ? | Appears in 1143 x 1145 and following suspension, again in 1145 x 1150. |
| Reginald | ? – 1174 | First known appearance in 1155. |
| Simon | 1175–1198 | |
| Master Anselm | 1198–1203 | Master of Reading, d. 1203. |
| Gervase | 1204–1234 | d. 1234. |
| Roger de Rudeby (Rudby) | 1234–1251 | Chamberlain of Pershore. |
| Elerius | 1251–1264 | Prior of Cogges. |
| Henry of Bidford | 1264 – ? | Master of Pershore. |
| Henry de Caldewelle | 1274–1290 | Master of Pershore. |
| William de Leghe | 1290–1307 | Cellarer of Pershore. |
| William of Harvington | 1307–1340 | Master of Pershore, etc. |
| Thomas of Pirton (Pyriton) | 1340–1349 | Cellarer of Pershore. |
| Peter of Pendock | 1349–1363 | Master of Pershore. |
| Peter (de) Bradewey(e) | 1363–1379 | Master of Pershore. |
| Thomas de Upton | 1379 | Elected 1379. |
| William de Newenton | 1413 | |
| Edmund Hert | 1456–1479 | |
| Robert Stanwey | 1479 | |
| John Pibleton | 1497 | |
| William Compton | 1504–1526 | |
| John Stonywell | 1526–1539 x 40 | Surrendered the abbey |

== Organ ==
The earliest record of an organ in Pershore Abbey is in the parish magazine for June 1825, which stated that the parishioners had started a voluntary subscription fund for the erection of an organ. This organ was built by Mr. Russell of London and opened by the organist Charles Clarke of Worcester Cathedral on 1 November 1826. This organ is thought to have functioned for 47 years when it was sold to All Saints' Church, Sedgley. In 1864 it is recorded that during a restoration of the church, it was reconstructed by Nicholson of Malvern and moved to the north-east chapel.

A new three-manual organ was built by Nicholson of Malvern and opened on 18 April 1873. The Nicholson was restored twice by J. W. Walker & Sons Ltd, in 1940 and 1971. This was replaced by a Bradford electronic organ.

A new pipe organ, costing around £850,000, was commissioned from the Fratelli Ruffatti workshop in Italy and installed in 2023.

Past organists and masters of music include Charles Tovey (1832-1868), William Hancox (1868-1869), Charles Henry Ogle (1869-1896), Edred Martin Chaundy (1898–1899, formerly of Enniskillen Parish Church, afterwards Holy Trinity Church, Stroud and Armagh Cathedral), Frank Alfred Charles Mason (1900–1949), Peter Bruce Waddington (1949-1951), Rodney Clifford Baldwyn (1951–1981), Ian Gerrard (1993–2003), Sheila Joynes (2003–2004), Mike Pegg (2004–2005), David Barclay (2005–2007) and Alex Crawford (2007–2008). In 2009, Mike Pegg resumed his former duties.

== Grounds ==
The buried foundations of the other monastic buildings, which lie to the southwest of the church, were identified in an archaeological excavation in 1929.

At the Dissolution, these buildings and the abbey grounds were acquired by John Richardson. The buildings were demolished and the grounds passed through various owners. Abbey House was later built on the site, sometime in the 1830s. In 1910 its owner, Henry Wise, donated the house to the Anglican Benedictine monks of Caldey Abbey, Pembrokeshire. When these monks converted to Roman Catholicism in 1913, they returned Abbey House to Wise who then provided it for the use of the small remnant of monks from Caldey who had remained Anglican. In 1922 the monks bought the house. They left Pershore for Nashdom Abbey, Buckinghamshire, in 1926, but only sold Abbey House in 1947 when it was demolished and the grounds became housing and parkland.

== See also ==
- List of English abbeys, priories and friaries serving as parish churches

== Gallery ==
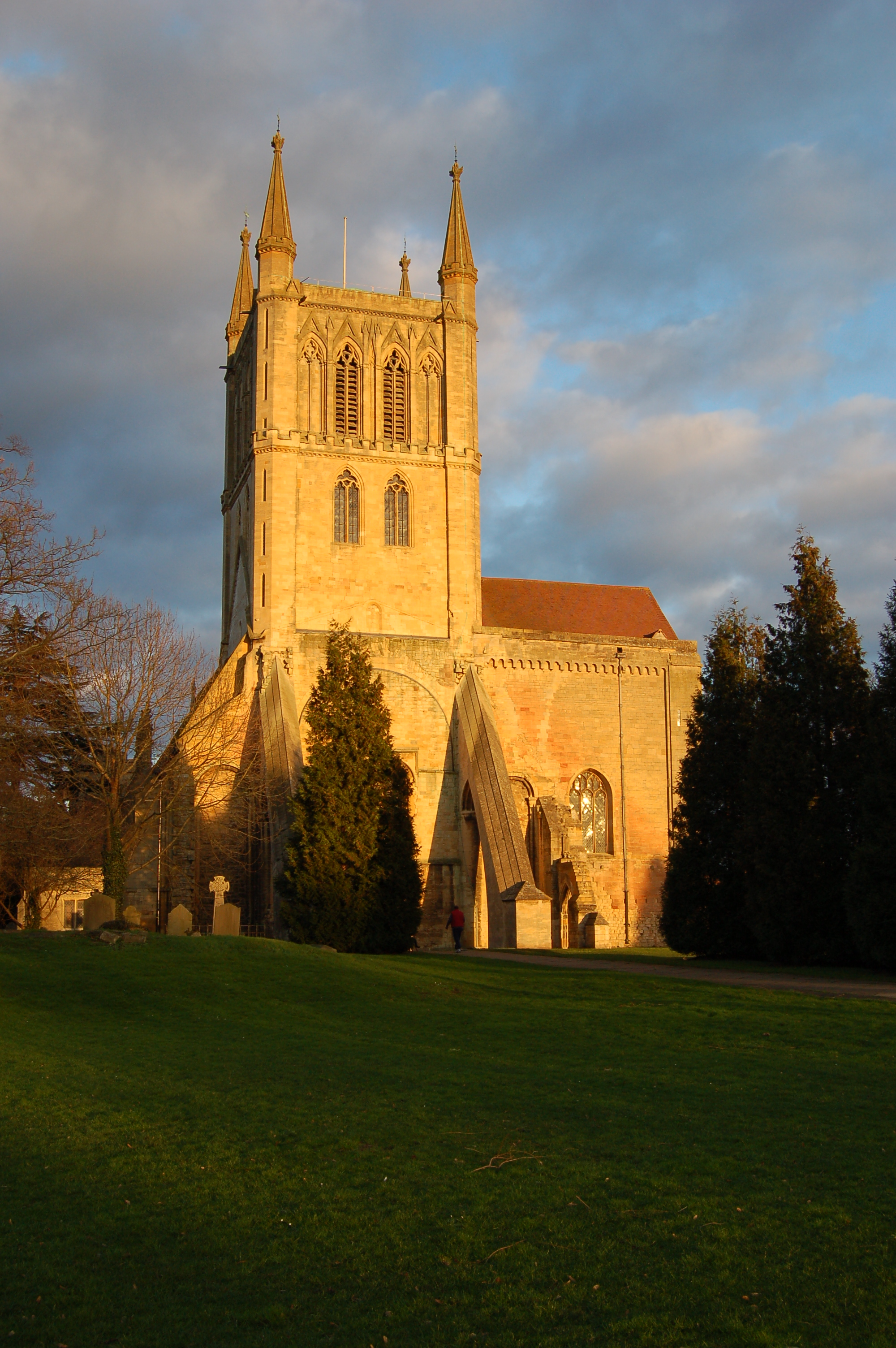
Pershore Abbey from the west

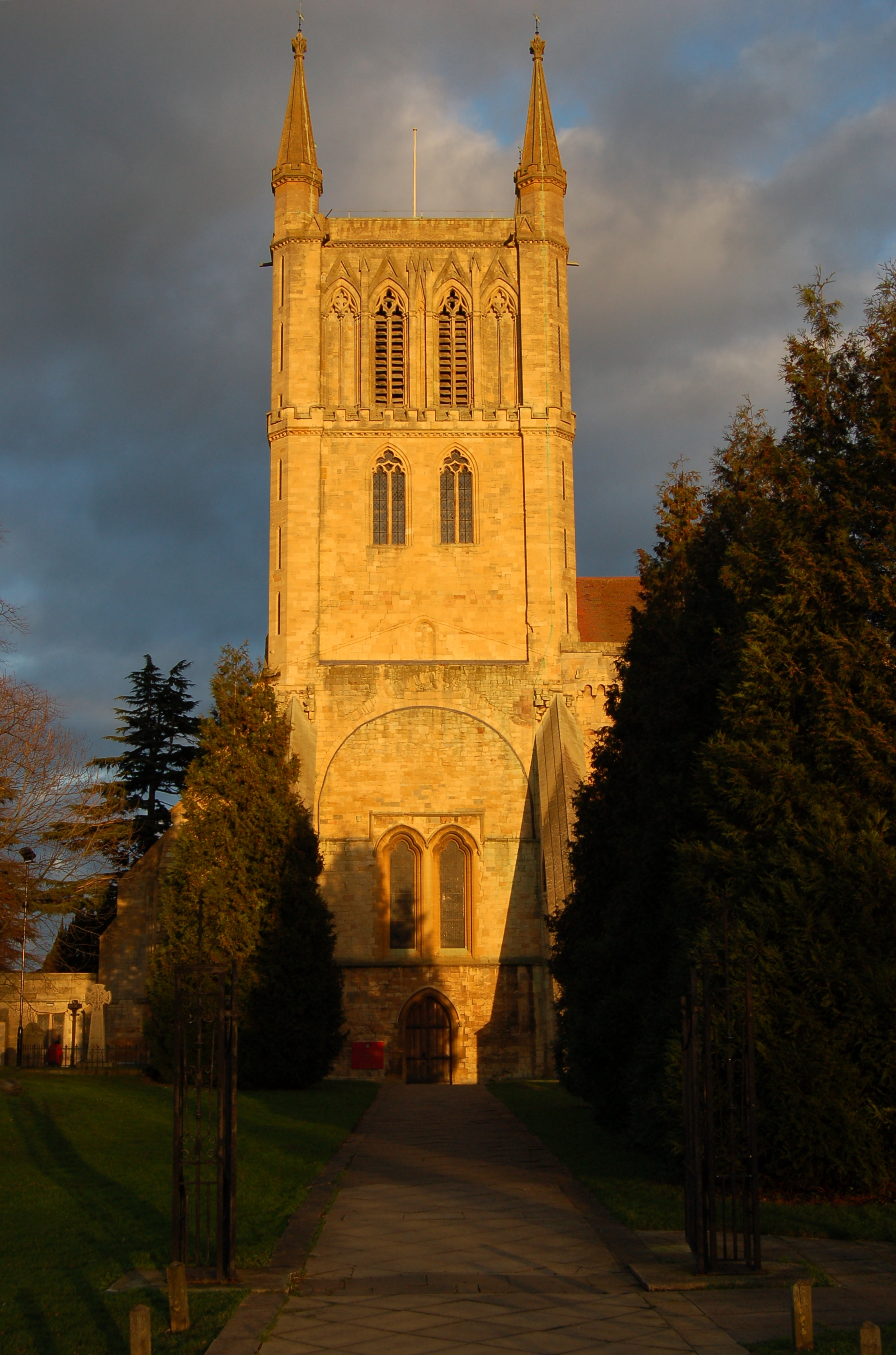
Western path to Pershore Abbey

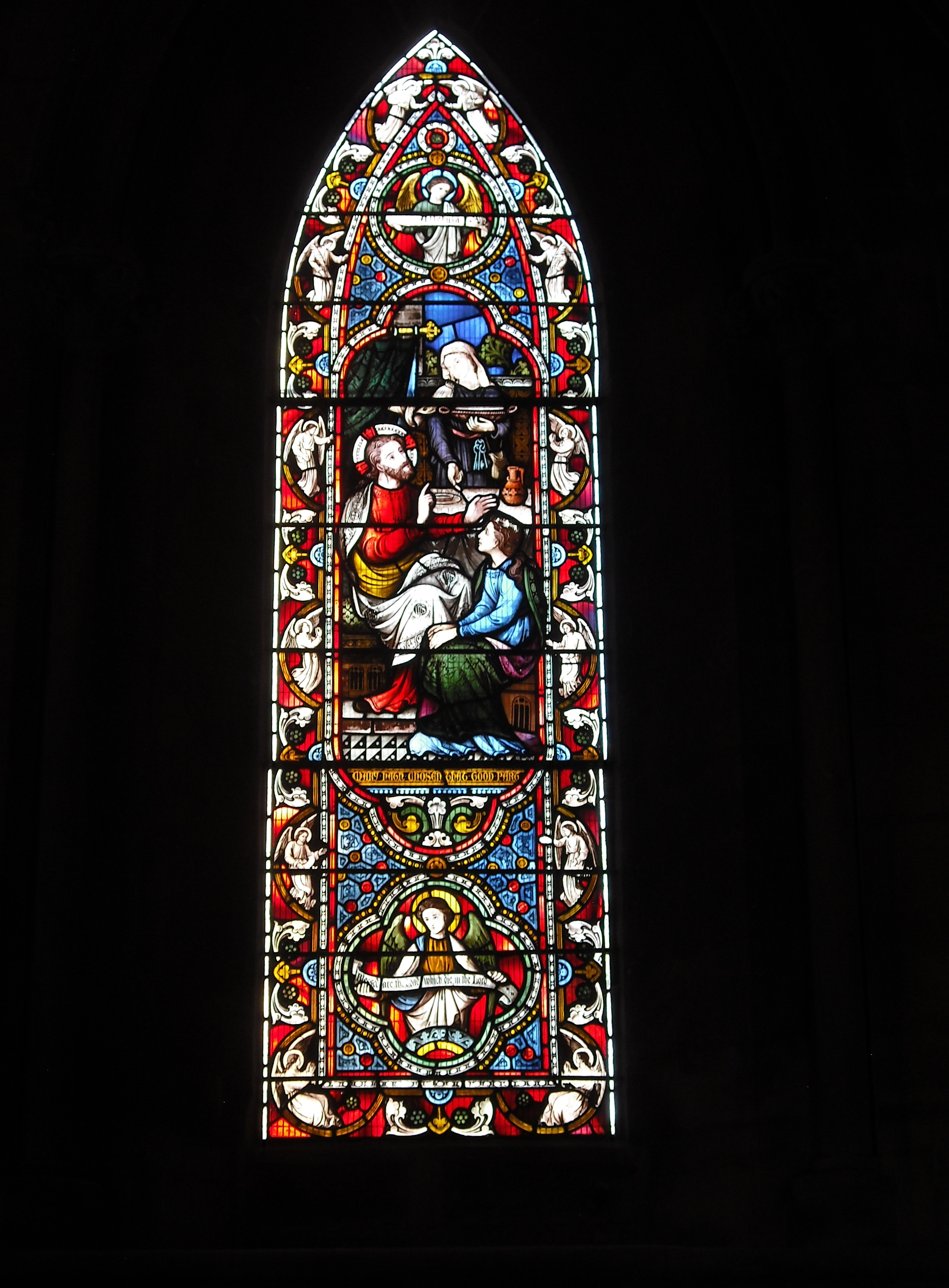
North aisle, NE window, by Franz Mayer & Co., 1898

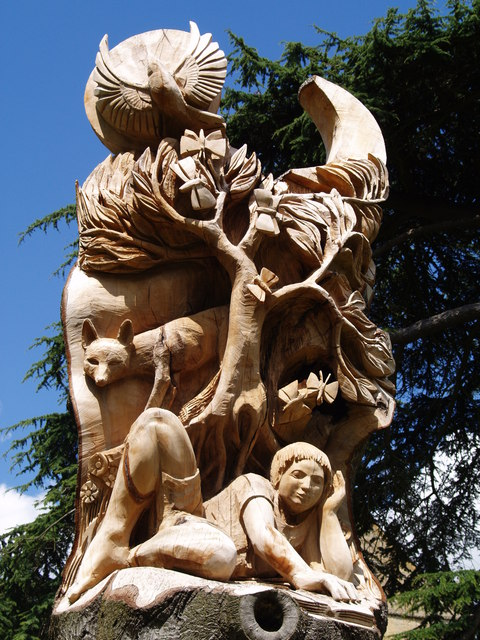
Abbey sculpture in the grounds

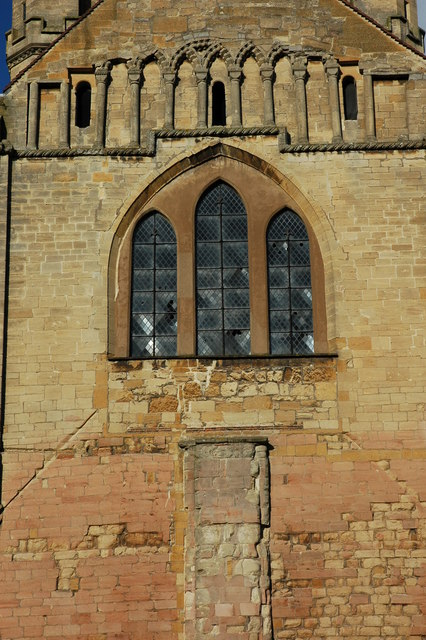
South transept
