= Ælsinus =

Ælsinus (10th century), was an Anglo-Saxon miniaturist, and a monk of New Minster, or Hyde Abbey, Winchester.

In a Miscellany among the Cotton MSS. in the British Library there is an "Office of the Holy Cross", written by Ælsinus for Ælfwine, afterwards abbot of Hyde. It is ornamented with miniatures of the Crucifixion and the Blessed Trinity. The miniatures are in outline of a greenish tint. Prefixed to the "Office" is a calendar commencing in 978, which is probably the date of the "Office".
