= Eadburh of Winchester =

Anglo-Saxon nun and daughter of King Edward the Elder

Saint Eadburh of Winchester
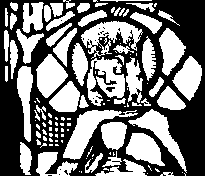
- Born: 921/924
- Died: 15 June 951/953
- Venerated in: Anglican Communion; Catholic Church; Eastern Orthodox Church
- Canonized: 972
- Feast: 15 June

Eadburh ([ˈæ͜ɑdˌburˠx]; also Edburga, Edburg; 921/924 – 15 June 951/953) was the daughter of King Edward the Elder of England and his third wife, Eadgifu of Kent. She lived most of her life as a nun known for her singing ability. Most of the information about her comes from hagiographies written several centuries after her life. She was canonised twelve years after her death and there are a small number of churches dedicated to her, most of which are located in the Worcestershire area.

== Life ==
In the 12th century, a Latin Life of Eadburh was written by Osbert of Clare, who became prior of Westminster in 1136. (Note: The text is edited (not translated) by Susan J. Ridyard.) The account by Osbert was commissioned in c. 1120 by the monks of Pershore Abbey in Worcestershire because they wanted the accounts they possessed of her life to be better organized; as Osbert put it, "her deeds seemed woven together in a confused expression". Scholar Katie Ann-Marie Bugyis stated that the nuns of Westminster had probably commissioned Osbert to write a biography of Eadburh for their use previously. According to Osbert, at the age of three, Eadburh was given as an oblate to the Queen Mother Ealhswith's foundation of St Mary's Abbey, Winchester (Nunnaminster). There Eadburh was educated and remained as a nun for the rest of her life.

Osbert also reported that perhaps because of her excellence in the practice of sung prayer, she was assigned the role of precentrix at Westminster, although scholar Susan Ridyard has questioned the historical validity of Osbert's claim, stating that he might have meant that she loved singing so much that it seemed that she was like a precentrix. Bugyis, however, insisted that Osbert's descriptions of Eadburh's duties fit the responsibilities of both cantor and sacristan duties. In Osbert's Life, he presented what Bugyis called "the most comprehensive, though admittingly idealized, depiction" of Eadburgh's musical abilities and leadership. He describes her devotion and commitment to the performance of the Divine Office in his chapter about her patience. She would often stay in the oratory for many hours after the Divine Office was completed to continue to pray in private, which the community's prioress punished her for because she considered it idleness, although the prioress eventually relented when she discovered that Eadburgh was the daughter of the king.

An anonymous hagiography from the early 14th century described "Eadburh's strict disciple of psalmody" and claimed that "she expressed divine praise through the singing of hymns", and reported that wore out her body fulfilling the injunction in the Psalms to pray seven times per day. According to Bugyis, Eadburh was also a "highly skilled singer of chants", which had been assigned to other cantors in earlier and contemporary customaries and liturgical books published and used in other monastic communities. Osbert related a story during a banquet held at the Winchester community during a visit from her father in which he commanded her to sing for the crowd; she initially resisted performing for them, but agreed when he promised to give her a reward. The audience was "held captive by the beauty of her singing" and she successfully procured additional financial support for the community from him and a promise to complete the construction of the abbey. Osbert claimed that the community benefitted from the king's gift even until his own time.

According to Bugyis, Eadburh's liturgical activities extended beyond her duties as cantor; Osbert reported that she also "held an important role in the celebration of the Eucharist" at Nunnaminster, although it is unclear exactly what activities she performed. Bugyis speculates that these activities could have included: preparing the hosts and ensuring that they and the wine and water were available before each Mass; bringing the elements to the altar during the offertory; assisting with the consecration and distribution of the Eucharist; and taking out the consecrated hosts during a communion service, when a priest was unavailable. Both Eadburgh and Edith of Wilton, abbess of Wilton Abbey, were praised by contemporary historian William of Malmesbury for their prayers and intercessions on behalf of their respective communities, as well as their members' "unfailing obedience" and devotion to their leaders and teachers.

There is little contemporary information for her life, but in a Winchester charter dated 939, she was the beneficiary of land at Droxford in Hampshire granted by her half-brother King Æthelstan.

According to one account, when Eadburh was three years of age, her father sought an indication as to whether she would live in the world or as a religious. On one side he placed rings and bracelets, on the other a chalice and gospel book. A nurse brought the child, and King Edward set her on his knee, inviting her to choose. When he set her down, she chose the religious items. Bugyis speculates that these items were meant for and used by Eadburh and the nuns at Nunnaminster.

The hagiography written of her in the 12th century by Osbert of Clare shows evidence of some of the unusual occurrences that might have happened in that time period when a member of a royal family became a monk or nun. In one story, her father visits her in the monastery and she sings for him, and he asks her if there is anything he can do for her, and she asks for him to give the community an estate at Canning, which he does so. In another story, the abbess found her reading alone, which was against the rules of the monastery, and then thrashed her. When the abbess realized it was the princess and not an ordinary nun, the abbess then begged forgiveness from her. In another story, she one time insisted on cleaning the shoes of her well-born companions, and they felt shocked by this and reported it to her father as behaviour that is not right for her. Osbert reported that despite her royal lineage, Eadburh obeyed her elders in the Nunnaminster, showed respect to her peers and members of the community who were younger than her, and "devoted herself to performing works of service" for her followers "that others deemed to be beneath her". One act of service was secretly cleaning her sisters' shoes, as Christ washed the feet of his disciples.

Eadburh died at Winchester in her thirtieth year on 15 June in 951, 952 or 953. Osbert reported that she led the Winchester community in song and praise, "even near the moment of her death", and that the other nuns continued to honour her memory by singing during her burial.

== Veneration ==
A cult developed after her death and is first mentioned in the Salisbury Psalter from the early 970s. In 972, some of her remains were transferred to Pershore Abbey in Worcestershire, which is dedicated to saints Mary, Peter, Paul, and Eadburh. Her feast is celebrated on 15 June.

Osbert recorded that after Eadburh's death, the nuns at Nunnaminster discovered, "through a series of miracles", that they had buried her in an inappropriate place that did not befit her sanctity, so they translated her body to a place near the choir in order that her pilgrims could better access her tomb and so that "she could be near the place where she had spent of much time in prayer". Eadburh, however, appeared to the nuns in a dream and informed them that she preferred to be buried near the altar, where she had regularly ministered.

The monks at Pershore Abbey, who commissioned Osbert to write Eadburh's hagiography, named her as one of their patron saints and acquired her relics in the late 10th century. The abbey's seal, created in the 1300s, Eadburh is depicted "in three-quarter length, facing forward, wearing a veil, holding a chalice in her right hand and an open book, likely the gospels, in her left". Bugyis states that Eadburh's position on the seal is remarkable because at monasteries in England during the time, the position, along with a sign of their office (a crosier or book) was usually held by the person who held a house's highest office. Bugyis insists that the seal conveys the Pershone Abbey monks' view of Eadburh as a representative of their identity and that they considered her as a figure of the abbot of their community. Finally, Bugyis states that they "took pride in identifying, and being identified, with her image because they used it continuously to close correspondance and to authenticate documents until at least 1534".

== Dedication of parish churches ==
There are a number of Church of England parish churches dedicated to St Eadburh of Winchester. Most of them are not far from Pershore Abbey, to which they were connected in some way.

- St Edburga, Abberton, Worcestershire (rebuilt 1882)
- St Eadburgha, Broadway, Worcestershire
- St Eadburgha, Ebrington, Gloucestershire (Note: The old local name for Ebrington was 'Yabberton', or more likely 'Yad-berton. See e.g. Stone, James Samuel (1893). Over the hills to Broadway. Philadelphia: Porter & Coates. p. 15. or Savory, Arthur H. (1920). Grain and Chaff from an English Manor. Oxford: Basil Blackwell. p. Chapter XXV (n.p.). This echoes the name of Abberton, Worcs., which was anciently called 'Eadbrihtinctune'. The 'Y' in Yabberton is formed in a similar way to the old Cotswold dialect word for 'head', yud, or yarn for 'to earn': thus *Yeadbrihtinctune.)
- St Edburga, Leigh, Worcestershire
- St Edburgha, Yardley, West Midlands
- The dedication of the church of St Aldhelm and St Eadburgha, Broadway, Somerset may be relatively modern: A Topographical Dictionary of England (1848) lists it as being dedicated to St Aldelme (sic) only. It retained the dedication to St Aldelme in 1875.

In Oxfordshire, St Edburg, Bicester, and SS Mary & Edburga, Stratton Audley, are both dedicated to Edburga of Bicester.

== Dedication of abbey churches ==
St Mary's Abbey, Winchester was at one time co-dedicated to St Eadburh. Pershore Abbey was also for some time dedicated to her after Egilwado (Alwardus or Æthelweard), the nephew of the Abbess of St Mary's Abbey, acquired some of her bones for £100. The dedication of the Abbey varied in its history. In the Domesday Book it is called the Abbey of St Mary; in Henry VIII's time the Valor of St Edburga. It has also been called the Church of SS Mary, Edburga and Holy Cross (the parochial portion was dedicated to the Holy Cross). In its earlier years SS Mary, Peter, and Paul were its patron saints, but at the time of the introduction of the Benedictines it was probably dedicated to St Mary, with whom was joined St Edburga, whose relics had then not long been added to its treasure.

== Sources ==
- Sawyer no. 446
- Osbert de Clare, Vita Edburgae, MS. Laud Misc. 114, f. 85–120 (Bodleian, Oxford), ed. S.J. Ridyard, The Royal Saints of Anglo-Saxon England. A Study of West Saxon and East Anglian Cults. Cambridge Studies in Medieval Life and Thought 4. Cambridge, 2008. 253 ff (Appendix).
- Anonymous, De vita sanctae Edburgae virginis, preserved in the early fourteenth-century MS Lansdowne 436, f. 41v-43v (British Library, London), ed. Laurel Braswell, "Saint Edburga" (see below). 329-33.
- Lectiones in Breviary of Hyde Abbey (late 13th century), Rawlinson liturg. E I and Gough liturg. 8 (Bodleian, Oxford)
- Life (in Middle English, late 13th century), MS Egerton 1993, f. 160-1 (BL, London); Eng. Poet. A I f. 32-32v and Bodley 779, f. 282-293v (Bodleian, Oxford), ed. Laurel Braswell, "Saint Edburga" (see below). 329-33.
- Bugyis, Katie Ann-Marie (2019). The Care of Nuns: The Ministries of Benedictine Women in England during the Central Middle Ages. New York: Oxford University Press. ISBN 978-0-19-085129-3. OCLC 1090397171.
- Ridyard, Susan J. (2008). The Royal Saints of Anglo-Saxon England. A Study of West Saxon and East Anglian Cults. Cambridge Studies in Medieval Life and Thought 4. Cambridge University Press. ISBN 9780521307727.
- Yorke, Barbara (2004). "Eadburh [St Eadburh, Eadburga] (921x4–951x3)". Oxford Dictionary of National Biography. Oxford University Press. doi:10.1093/ref:odnb/49419. (subscription, Wikipedia Library access or UK public library membership required)
