= Battle of Farnham =

Battle between the Anglo-Saxons and Norse Viking invaders

- Part of the Viking invasions of England
| Date | 892 AD |
| Location | Farnham, England |
| Result | Anglo-Saxon victory |

Belligerents
| Anglo-Saxons | Vikings |

Commanders and leaders
| Edward the Elder Alfred the Great | Unknown |

Casualties and losses
| Unknown | Unknown |

The Battle of Farnham was an armed conflict between the Anglo-Saxons, under the command of Alfred the Great and Edward the Elder, and the Danish invaders. The raiding army had captured much loot from Hampshire and Berkshire before starting to return to Essex and their fleet. A Wessex army led by Edward, son of King Alfred, intercepted them at Farnham, defeated them and recaptured the plunder. The battle concluded with the Danes fleeing across the Thames towards Essex.
