= Edward the Elder =

King of the Anglo-Saxons from 899 to 924

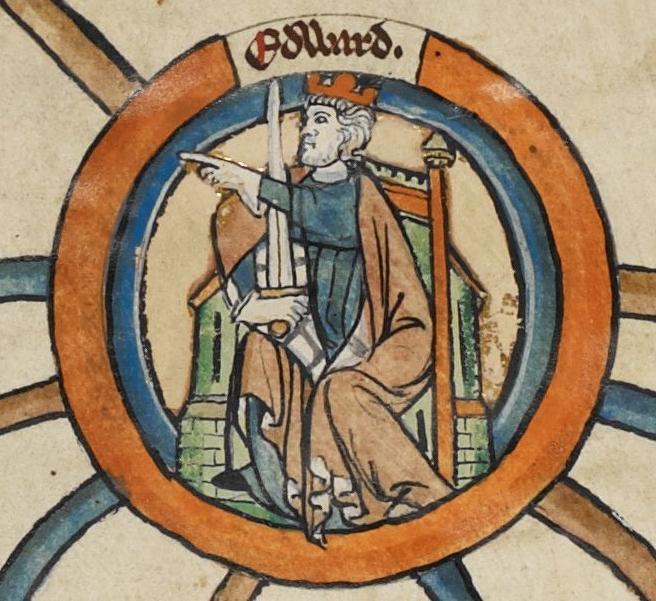
- Portrait miniature from a thirteenth-century genealogical scroll depicting Edward

King of the Anglo-Saxons
- Reign: 26 October 899 – 17 July 924
- Coronation: 8 June 900; Kingston upon Thames
- Predecessor: Alfred the Great
- Successor: Æthelstan (or Ælfweard, disputed)
- Born: Probably mid-870s
- Died: 17 July 924; Farndon, Cheshire, Mercia
- Burial: New Minster, Winchester, later translated to Hyde Abbey
- Spouses: Ecgwynn; Ælfflæd; Eadgifu
- Issue more ...: Æthelstan, King of the English; A daughter who was Queen of York (possibly Edith of Polesworth); Ælfweard; Edwin; Eadgifu, Queen of the West Franks; Eadhild, Duchess of the Franks; Eadgyth, Queen of the East Franks; Edmund I, King of the English; Eadred, King of the English; Eadburh
- House: Wessex
- Father: Alfred the Great
- Mother: Ealhswith

Edward the Elder (870s? – 17 July 924) was King of the Anglo-Saxons from 899 until his death in 924. He was the elder son of Alfred the Great and his wife Ealhswith. When Edward succeeded to the throne, he had to defeat a challenge from his cousin Æthelwold, who had a strong claim to the throne as the son of Alfred's elder brother and predecessor, Æthelred I.

Alfred had succeeded Æthelred as king of Wessex in 871, and almost faced defeat against the Danish Vikings until his decisive victory at the Battle of Edington in 878. After the battle, the Vikings still ruled Northumbria, East Anglia and eastern Mercia, leaving only Wessex and western Mercia under Anglo-Saxon control. In the early 880s Æthelred, Lord of the Mercians, the ruler of western Mercia, accepted Alfred's lordship and married his daughter Æthelflæd, and around 886 Alfred adopted the new title King of the Anglo-Saxons as the ruler of all Anglo-Saxons not subject to Danish rule. Edward inherited the new title when Alfred died in 899.

In 910, a Mercian and West Saxon army inflicted a decisive defeat on an invading Northumbrian army, ending the threat from the northern Vikings. In the decade that followed, Edward conquered Viking-ruled southern England in partnership with his sister Æthelflæd, who had succeeded as Lady of the Mercians following the death of her husband in 911. Historians dispute how far Mercia was dominated by Wessex during this period, and after Æthelflæd's death in June 918, her daughter Ælfwynn briefly became second Lady of the Mercians, but in December Edward took her into Wessex and imposed direct rule on Mercia. By the end of the 910s he ruled Wessex, Mercia and East Anglia, and only Northumbria remained under Viking rule. In 924 he faced a Mercian and Welsh revolt at Chester, and after putting it down he died at Farndon in Cheshire on 17 July 924. He was succeeded by his eldest son, Æthelstan. Edward's two youngest sons later reigned as kings Edmund I and Eadred.

Edward was admired by medieval chroniclers, and in the view of William of Malmesbury, he was "much inferior to his father in the cultivation of letters" but "incomparably more glorious in the power of his rule". He was largely ignored by modern historians until the 1990s, and Nick Higham described him as "perhaps the most neglected of English kings", partly because few primary sources for his reign survive. His reputation rose in the late twentieth century and he is now seen as destroying the power of the Vikings in southern England while laying the foundations for a south-centred united English kingdom.

== Background ==
Mercia was the dominant kingdom in southern England in the eighth century and maintained its position until it suffered a decisive defeat by Wessex at the Battle of Ellandun in 825. Thereafter the two kingdoms became allies, which was to be an important factor in English resistance to the Vikings. In 865, the Danish Viking Great Heathen Army landed in East Anglia and used this as a starting point for an invasion. The East Anglians were forced to pay off the Vikings, who invaded Northumbria the following year. They appointed a puppet king in 867, and then moved on Mercia, where they spent the winter of 867–868. King Burgred of Mercia was joined by King Æthelred of Wessex and his brother, the future Alfred the Great, for a combined attack on the Vikings, who refused an engagement; in the end the Mercians bought peace with them. The following year, the Danes conquered East Anglia, and in 874 they expelled King Burgred and, with their support, Ceolwulf became the last King of Mercia. In 877 the Vikings partitioned Mercia, taking the eastern regions for themselves and allowing Ceolwulf to keep the western ones. In early 878 they invaded Wessex, and many West Saxons submitted to them. Alfred, who was now king, was reduced to a remote base in the Isle of Athelney in Somerset, but the situation was transformed when he won a decisive victory at the Battle of Edington. He was thus able to prevent the Vikings from taking Wessex and western Mercia, although they still occupied Northumbria, East Anglia and eastern Mercia.

== Childhood ==
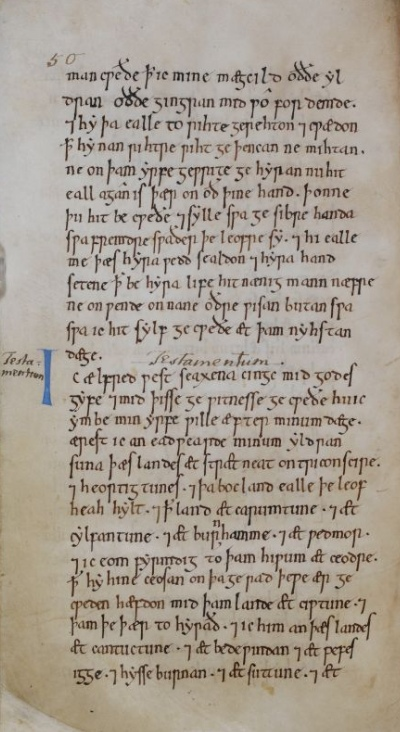
A page from the will of Alfred the Great, headed Testamentum in a later hand, which left the bulk of his estate to Edward

Edward's parents, Alfred and Ealhswith, married in 868. Ealhswith's father was Æthelred Mucel, Ealdorman of the Gaini, and her mother, Eadburh, was a member of the Mercian royal family. Alfred and Ealhswith had five children who survived childhood. The oldest was Æthelflæd, who married Æthelred, Lord of the Mercians, and ruled as Lady of the Mercians after his death. Edward was next, and the second daughter, Æthelgifu, became abbess of Shaftesbury. The third daughter, Ælfthryth, married Baldwin, Count of Flanders, and the younger son, Æthelweard, was given a scholarly education, including learning Latin. This would usually suggest that he was intended for the church, but it is unlikely in Æthelweard's case as he later had sons. There were also an unknown number of children who died young. Neither part of Edward's name, which means "protector of wealth", had been used previously by the West Saxon royal house, and Barbara Yorke suggests that he may have been named after his maternal grandmother Eadburh, reflecting the West Saxon policy of strengthening links with Mercia.

Historians estimate that Edward was probably born in the mid-870s. His eldest sister, Æthelflæd, was probably born about a year after her parents' marriage, and Edward was brought up with his youngest sister, Ælfthryth; Yorke argues that he was therefore probably nearer in age to Ælfthryth than Æthelflæd. Edward led troops in battle in 893, and must have been of marriageable age in that year as his oldest son Æthelstan was born about 894. According to Asser in his Life of King Alfred, Edward and Ælfthryth were educated at court by male and female tutors, and read ecclesiastical and secular works in English, such as the Psalms and Old English poems. They were taught the courtly qualities of gentleness and humility, and Asser wrote that they were obedient to their father and friendly to visitors. This is the only known case of an Anglo-Saxon prince and princess receiving the same upbringing.

== Ætheling ==
As a son of a king, Edward was an ætheling, a prince of the royal house who was eligible for kingship. Even though he had the advantage of being the eldest son of the reigning king, his accession was not assured as he had cousins who had a strong claim to the throne. Æthelhelm and Æthelwold were sons of Æthelred, Alfred's older brother and predecessor as king, but they had been passed over because they were infants when their father died. Asser gives more information about Edward's childhood and youth than is known about other Anglo-Saxon princes, providing details about the training of a prince in a period of Carolingian influence, and Yorke suggests that we may know so much due to Alfred's efforts to portray his son as the most throneworthy ætheling.

Æthelhelm is recorded only in Alfred's will of the mid-880s, and probably died at some time in the next decade, but Æthelwold is listed above Edward in the only charter where he appears, probably indicating a higher status. Æthelwold may also have had an advantage because his mother Wulfthryth witnessed a charter as queen, whereas Edward's mother Ealhswith never had a higher status than king's wife. However, Alfred was in a position to give his own son considerable advantages. In his will, he left only a handful of estates to his brother's sons, and the bulk of his property to Edward, including all his booklands (land vested in a charter which could be alienated by the holder, as opposed to folkland, which had to pass to heirs of the body) in Kent. Alfred also advanced men who could be depended on to support his plans for his succession, such as his brother-in-law, a Mercian ealdorman called Æthelwulf, and his son-in-law Æthelred. Edward witnessed several of his father's charters, and often accompanied him on royal peregrinations. In a Kentish charter of 898 Edward witnessed as rex Saxonum, suggesting that Alfred may have followed the strategy adopted by his grandfather Egbert of strengthening his son's claim to succeed to the West Saxon throne by making him sub-king of Kent.

Once Edward grew up, Alfred was able to give him military commands and experience in royal administration. The English defeated renewed Viking attacks in 893 to 896, and in Richard Abels' view, the glory belonged to Æthelred and Edward rather than Alfred himself. In 893, Edward defeated the Vikings in the Battle of Farnham although he was unable to follow up his victory as his troops' period of service had expired and he had to release them. The situation was saved by the arrival of troops from London led by Æthelred. Yorke argues that although Alfred packed the witan with members whose interests lay in the continuation of Alfred's line, that may not have been sufficient to ensure Edward's accession if he had not displayed his fitness for kingship.

In about 893, Edward probably married Ecgwynn, who bore him two children, the future King Æthelstan and a daughter who married Sitric Cáech, a Viking King of York. The twelfth-century chronicler William of Malmesbury described Ecgwynn as an illustris femina (noble lady), and stated that Edward chose Æthelstan as his heir as king. She may have been related to St Dunstan, the aristocratic tenth-century Archbishop of Canterbury. But William of Malmesbury also stated that Æthelstan's accession in 924 was opposed by a nobleman who claimed that his mother was a concubine of low birth. The suggestion that Ecgwynn was Edward's mistress is accepted by some historians such as Simon Keynes and Richard Abels, but Yorke and Æthelstan's biographer, Sarah Foot, disagree, arguing that the allegations should be seen in the context of the disputed succession in 924, and were not an issue in the 890s. Ecgwynn probably died by 899, as around the time of Alfred's death Edward married Ælfflæd, the daughter of Ealdorman Æthelhelm, probably of Wiltshire.

Janet Nelson suggests that there was conflict between Alfred and Edward in the 890s. She points out that the contemporary Anglo-Saxon Chronicle, produced under court auspices in the 890s, does not mention Edward's military successes. These are known only from the late tenth century chronicle of Æthelweard, such as his account of the Battle of Farnham, in which in Nelson's view "Edward's military prowess, and popularity with a following of young warriors, are highlighted." Towards the end of his life Alfred invested his young grandson Æthelstan in a ceremony which historians see as designation as eventual successor to the kingship. Nelson argues that while this may have been proposed by Edward to support the accession of his own son, on the other hand it may have been intended by Alfred as part of a scheme to divide the kingdom between his son and grandson. Æthelstan was sent to be brought up in Mercia by Æthelflæd and Æthelred, but it is not known whether this was Alfred's idea or Edward's. Alfred's wife Ealhswith was ignored in the Anglo-Saxon Chronicle in her husband's lifetime, but emerged from obscurity when her son acceded. This may be because she supported her son against her husband.

== Æthelwold's revolt ==
Alfred died on 26 October 899 and Edward succeeded to the throne, but Æthelwold disputed the succession. He seized the royal estates of Wimborne, symbolically important as the place where his father was buried, and Christchurch, both in Dorset. Edward marched with his army to the nearby Iron Age hillfort at Badbury Rings. Æthelwold declared that he would live or die at Wimborne, but then left in the night and rode to Northumbria, where the Danes accepted him as king. Edward was crowned on 8 June 900 at Kingston upon Thames. (Note: The twelfth-century chronicler Ralph of Diceto stated that the coronation took place at Kingston, and this is accepted by Simon Keynes, although Sarah Foot says that "Edward might well have held the ceremony at Winchester.")

In 901, Æthelwold came with a fleet to Essex, and the following year he persuaded the East Anglian Danes to invade English Mercia and northern Wessex, where his army looted and then returned home. Edward retaliated by ravaging East Anglia, but when he retreated the men of Kent disobeyed the order to retire, and were intercepted by the Danish army. The two sides met at the Battle of the Holme (perhaps Holme in Huntingdonshire) on 13 December 902. According to the Anglo-Saxon Chronicle, the Danes "kept the place of slaughter", meaning that they won the battle, but they suffered heavy losses, including Æthelwold and a King Eohric, possibly of the East Anglian Danes. Kentish losses included Sigehelm, ealdorman of Kent and father of Edward's third wife, Eadgifu. Æthelwold's death ended the threat to Edward's throne.

== King of the Anglo-Saxons ==
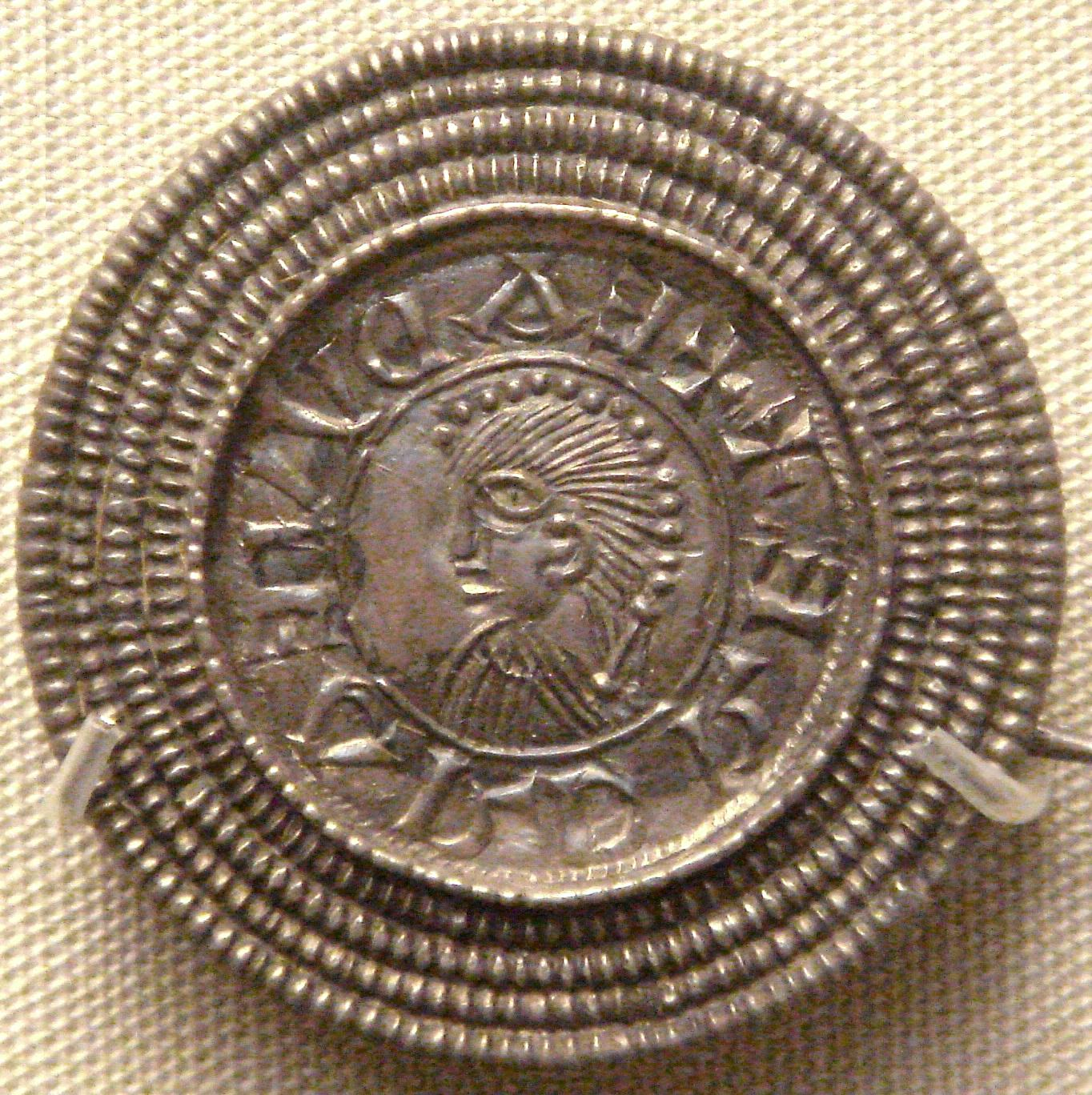
Silver pseudo-coin brooch found at the Villa Wolkonsky in Rome. It is based on a coin of Edward the Elder and is probably contemporary.

In London in 886, Alfred had received the formal submission of "all the English people that were not under subjection to the Danes", and thereafter he adopted the title Anglorum Saxonum rex (King of the Anglo-Saxons), which is used in his later charters and all but two of Edward's. This is seen by Keynes as "the invention of a wholly new and distinctive polity", covering both West Saxons and Mercians, which was inherited by Edward with the support of Mercians at the West Saxon court, of whom the most important was Plegmund, Archbishop of Canterbury. In 903 Edward issued several charters concerning land in Mercia. Three of them are witnessed by the Mercian leaders and their daughter Ælfwynn, and they all contain a statement that Æthelred and Æthelflæd "then held rulership and power over the race of the Mercians, under the aforesaid king". Other charters were issued by the Mercian leaders which did not contain any acknowledgment of Edward's authority, but they did not issue their own coinage. This view of Edward's status is accepted by Martin Ryan, who states that Æthelred and Æthelflæd had "a considerable but ultimately subordinate share of royal authority" in English Mercia.

Other historians disagree. Pauline Stafford describes Æthelflæd as "the last Mercian queen", while in Charles Insley's view Mercia kept its independence until Æthelflæd's death in 918. Michael Davidson contrasts the 903 charters with one of 901 in which the Mercian rulers were "by grace of God, holding, governing and defending the monarchy of the Mercians". Davidson comments that "the evidence for Mercian subordination is decidedly mixed. Ultimately, the ideology of the 'Kingdom of the Anglo-Saxons' may have been less successful in achieving the absorption of Mercia and more something which I would see as a murky political coup." The Anglo-Saxon Chronicle was compiled at the West Saxon court from the 890s, and the entries for the late ninth and early tenth centuries are seen by historians as reflecting the West Saxon viewpoint; Davidson observes: "Alfred and Edward possessed skilled "spin doctors"." Some versions of the Chronicle incorporate part of a lost Mercian Register, which gives a Mercian perspective and details of Æthelflæd's campaign against the Vikings.

In the late ninth and early tenth centuries, connection by marriage with the West Saxon royal house was seen as prestigious by continental rulers. In the mid-890s Alfred had married his daughter Ælfthryth to Baldwin II of Flanders, and in 919 Edward married his daughter Eadgifu to Charles the Simple, King of West Francia. In 925, after Edward's death, another daughter Eadgyth married Otto, the future King of Germany and (after Eadgyth's death) Holy Roman Emperor.

== Conquest of the southern Danelaw ==
No battles are recorded between the Anglo-Saxons and the Danish Vikings for several years after the Battle of the Holme, but in 906, Edward agreed to peace with the East Anglian and Northumbrian Danes, suggesting that there had been conflict. According to one version of the Anglo-Saxon Chronicle he made peace "of necessity", which implies that he was forced to buy them off. He encouraged Englishmen to purchase land in Danish territory, and two charters survive relating to estates in Bedfordshire and Derbyshire. In 909, Edward sent a combined West Saxon and Mercian army which harassed the Northumbrian Danes, and seized the bones of the Northumbrian royal saint Oswald from Bardney Abbey in Lincolnshire. Oswald was translated to a new Mercian minster established by Æthelred and Æthelflæd in Gloucester and the Danes were compelled to accept peace on Edward's terms. In the following year, the Northumbrian Danes retaliated by raiding Mercia, but on their way home they were met by a combined Mercian and West Saxon army at the Battle of Tettenhall, where the Vikings suffered a disastrous defeat. After that, the Northumbrian Danes did not venture south of the River Humber during Edward's reign, and he and his Mercian allies were able to concentrate on conquering the southern Danelaw in East Anglia and the Five Boroughs of Viking east Mercia: Derby, Leicester, Lincoln, Nottingham and Stamford.

In 911, Æthelred, Lord of the Mercians, died, and Edward took control of the Mercian lands around London and Oxford. Æthelred was succeeded as ruler by his widow Æthelflæd (Edward's sister) as Lady of the Mercians, and she had probably been acting as ruler for several years as Æthelred seems to have been incapacitated in later life.

Edward and Æthelflæd then began the construction of fortresses to guard against Viking attacks and protect territory captured from them. In November 911, he constructed a fort on the north bank of the River Lea at Hertford to guard against attack by the Danes of Bedford and Cambridge. In 912, he marched with his army to Maldon, Essex, and ordered the building of a fort at Witham and a second fort at Hertford, which protected London from attack and encouraged many English living under Danish rule in Essex to submit to him. In 913, there was a pause in his activities, although Æthelflæd continued her fortress building in Mercia. In 914, a Viking army sailed from Brittany and ravaged the Severn estuary. It then attacked Ergyng in south-east Wales (now Archenfield in Herefordshire) and captured Cyfeilliog, Bishop of Ergyng. Edward ransomed him for the large sum of forty pounds of silver. The Vikings were defeated by the armies of Hereford and Gloucester, and gave hostages and oaths to keep the peace. Edward kept an army on the south side of the estuary in case the Vikings broke their promises, and he twice had to repel attacks. In the autumn the Vikings moved on to Ireland. The episode suggests that south-east Wales fell within the West Saxon sphere of power, unlike Brycheiniog just to the north, where Mercia was dominant. In late 914 Edward built two forts at Buckingham, and Earl Thurketil, the leader of the Danish army at Bedford submitted to him. The following year Edward occupied Bedford, and constructed another fortification on the south bank of the River Great Ouse against a Viking one on the north bank. In 916, he returned to Essex and built a fort at Maldon to bolster the defence of Witham. He also helped Earl Thurketil and his followers to leave England, reducing the number of Viking armies in the Midlands.

The decisive year in the war was 917. In April, Edward built a fort at Towcester in Northamptonshire as a defence against the Danes of Northampton, and another at an unidentified place called Wigingamere. The Danes launched unsuccessful attacks on Towcester, Bedford and Wigingamere, while Æthelflæd captured Derby, showing the value of the English defensive measures, which were aided by disunity and a lack of coordination among the Viking armies. The Danes had built their own fortress at Tempsford in Bedfordshire, but at the end of the summer the English stormed it and killed the last Danish king of East Anglia. The English then took Colchester, although they did not try to hold it. The Danes retaliated by sending a large army to lay siege to Maldon, but the garrison held out until it was relieved and the retreating army was heavily defeated. Edward then returned to Towcester and reinforced its fort with a stone wall, and the Danes of nearby Northampton submitted to him. The armies of Cambridge and East Anglia also submitted, and by the end of the year the only Danish armies still holding out were those of four of the Five Boroughs, Leicester, Stamford, Nottingham, and Lincoln.

In early 918, Æthelflæd secured the submission of Leicester without a fight, and the Danes of Northumbrian York offered her their allegiance, probably for protection against Norse (Norwegian) Vikings who had invaded Northumbria from Ireland, but she died on 12 June before she could take up the proposal. The same offer is not known to have been made to Edward, and the Norse Vikings took York in 919. According to the main West Saxon version of the Anglo-Saxon Chronicle, after Æthelflæd's death the Mercians submitted to Edward, but the Mercian version (the Mercian Register) states that in December 918 her daughter Ælfwynn "was deprived of all authority in Mercia and taken into Wessex". Mercia may have made a bid for continued semi-independence which was suppressed by Edward, and it then came under his direct rule. Stamford had surrendered to Edward before Æthelflæd's death, and Nottingham did the same shortly afterwards. According to the Anglo-Saxon Chronicle for 918, "All the people who had settled in Mercia, both Danish and English, submitted to him." This would mean that he ruled all England south of the Humber, but it is not clear whether Lincoln was an exception, as coins of Viking York in the early 920s were probably minted at Lincoln. Some Danish jarls were allowed to keep their estates, although Edward probably also rewarded his supporters with land, and some he kept in his own hands. Coin evidence suggests that his authority was stronger in the East Midlands than in East Anglia. Three Welsh kings, Hywel Dda, Clydog and Idwal Foel, who had previously been subject to Æthelflæd, now gave their allegiance to Edward.

== Coinage ==
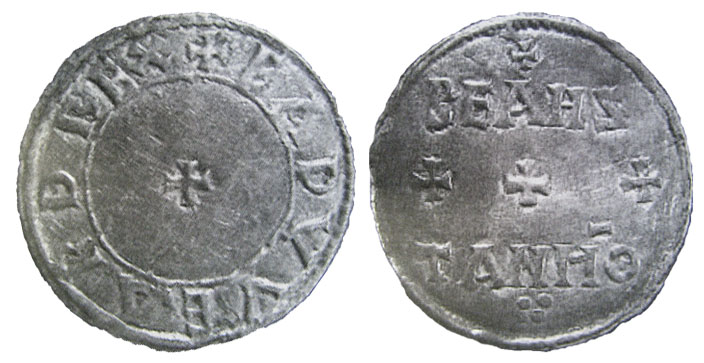
Silver penny of Edward the Elder

The principal currency in later Anglo-Saxon England was the silver penny, and some coins carried a stylised portrait of the king. Edward's coins had "EADVVEARD REX" on the obverse and the name of the moneyer on the reverse. The places of issue were not shown in his reign, but they were in that of his son Æthelstan, allowing the location of many moneyers of Edward's reign to be established. There were mints in Bath, Canterbury, Chester, Chichester, Derby, Exeter, Hereford, London, Oxford, Shaftesbury, Shrewsbury, Southampton, Stafford, Wallingford, Wareham, Winchester and probably other towns. No coins were struck in the name of Æthelred or Æthelflæd, but from around 910 mints in English Mercia produced coins with an unusual decorative design on the reverse. This ceased before 920, and probably represents Æthelflæd's way of distinguishing her coinage from that of her brother. There was also a minor issue of coins in the name of Plegmund, Archbishop of Canterbury. There was a dramatic increase in the number of moneyers over Edward's reign, fewer than 25 in the south in the first ten years rising to 67 in the last ten years, around five in English Mercia rising to 23, plus 27 in the conquered Danelaw.

== Church ==
In 908, Plegmund conveyed the alms of the English king and people to the Pope, the first visit to Rome by an Archbishop of Canterbury for almost a century, and the journey may have been to seek papal approval for a proposed re-organisation of the West Saxon sees. When Edward came to the throne Wessex had two dioceses, Winchester, held by Denewulf, and Sherborne, held by Asser. In 908, Denewulf died and was replaced the following year by Frithestan; soon afterwards Winchester was divided into two sees, with the creation of the diocese of Ramsbury covering Wiltshire and Berkshire, while Winchester was left with Hampshire and Surrey. Forged charters date the division to 909, but this may not be correct. Asser died in the same year, and at some date between 909 and 918 Sherborne was divided into three sees, Crediton covering Devon and Cornwall, and Wells covering Somerset, leaving Sherborne with Dorset. The effect of the changes was to strengthen the status of Canterbury compared with Winchester and Sherborne, but the division may have been related to a change in the secular functions of West Saxon bishops, to become agents of royal government in shires rather than provinces, assisting in defence and taking part in shire courts.

At the beginning of Edward's reign, his mother Ealhswith founded the abbey of St Mary for nuns, known as the Nunnaminster, in Winchester. Edward's daughter Eadburh became a nun there, and she was venerated as a saint and the subject of a hagiography by Osbert of Clare in the twelfth century. In 901, Edward started building a major religious community for men, possibly in accordance with his father's wishes. The monastery was next to Winchester Cathedral, which became known as the Old Minster while Edward's foundation was called the New Minster. It was much larger than the Old Minster, and was probably intended as a royal mausoleum. It acquired relics of the Breton Saint Judoc, which probably arrived in England from Ponthieu in 901, and the body of one of Alfred's closest advisers, Grimbald, who died in the same year and who was soon venerated as a saint. Edward's mother died in 902, and he buried her and Alfred there, moving his father's body from the Old Minster. Burials in the early 920s included Edward himself, his brother Æthelweard, and his son Ælfweard. On the other hand, when Æthelstan became king in 924, he did not show any favour to his father's foundation, probably because Winchester sided against him when the throne was disputed after Edward's death. The only other king buried at the New Minster was Eadwig, in 959.

Edward's decision not to expand the Old Minster, but rather to overshadow it with a much larger building, suggests animosity towards Bishop Denewulf, and this was compounded by forcing the Old Minster to cede both land for the new site, and an estate of seventy hides at Beddington to provide an income for the New Minster. Edward was remembered by the New Minster as a benefactor, but at the Old Minster as rex avidus (greedy king). He may have built the new church because he did not think that the Old Minster was grand enough to be the royal mausoleum for kings of the Anglo-Saxons, not just the West Saxons like their predecessors. Alan Thacker comments:

Edward's method of endowing New Minster was of a piece with his ecclesiastical policy in general. Like his father he gave little to the church indeed, judging by the dearth of charters for much of his reign he seems to have given away little at all ... More than any other, Edward's kingship seems to epitomise the new hard-nosed monarchy of Wessex, determined to exploit all its resources, lay and ecclesiastical, for its own benefit.

Patrick Wormald observes: "The thought occurs that neither Alfred nor Edward was greatly beloved at Winchester Cathedral; and one reason for Edward's moving his father's body into the new family shrine next door was that he was surer of sincere prayers there."

== Learning and culture ==
The standard of Anglo-Saxon learning declined severely in the ninth century, particularly in Wessex, and Mercian scholars such as Plegmund played a major part in the revival of learning initiated by Alfred. Mercians were prominent at the courts of Alfred and Edward, and the Mercian dialect and scholarship commanded West Saxon respect. It is uncertain how far Alfred's programmes continued during his son's reign. English translations of works in Latin made during Alfred's reign continued to be copied, but few original works are known. The script known as Anglo-Saxon Square minuscule reached maturity in the 930s, and its earliest phases date to Edward's reign. The main scholarly and scriptorial centres were the cathedral centres of Canterbury, Winchester and Worcester; monasteries did not make a significant contribution until Æthelstan's reign. Very little survives of the manuscript production of Edward's reign.

The only surviving large-scale embroideries which were certainly made in Anglo-Saxon England date to Edward's reign. They are a stole, a maniple and a possible girdle removed from the coffin of St Cuthbert in Durham Cathedral in the nineteenth century. They were donated to the shrine by Æthelstan in 934, but inscriptions on the embroideries show that they were commissioned by Edward's second wife, Ælfflæd, as a gift to Frithestan, Bishop of Winchester. They probably did not reach their intended destination because Æthelstan was on bad terms with Winchester.

== Law and administration ==
In 901 a meeting at Southampton was attended by Edward's brother and sons, his household thegns and nearly all bishops, but no ealdormen. It was on this occasion that the king acquired land from the Bishop of Winchester for the foundation of the New Minster, Winchester. No charters survive for the period from 910 to the king's death in 924, much to the puzzlement and distress of historians. Charters were usually issued when the king made grants of land, and it is possible that Edward followed a policy of retaining property which came into his hands to help finance his campaigns against the Vikings. Charters rarely survive unless they concerned property which passed to the church and were preserved in their archives, and another possibility is that Edward was making grants of property only on terms which ensured that they returned to male members of the royal house; such charters would not be found in church archives.

Clause 3 of the law code called I Edward provides that people convincingly charged with perjury shall not be allowed to clear themselves by oath, but only by ordeal. This is the start of the continuous history in England of trial by ordeal; it is probably mentioned in the laws of King Ine (688 to 726), (Note: It is not certain that the references in Ine's laws are to trial by ordeal.) but not in later codes such as those of Alfred. The administrative and legal system in Edward's reign may have depended extensively on written records, almost none of which survive. Edward was one of the few Anglo-Saxon kings to issue laws about bookland. There was increasing confusion in the period as to what was really bookland; Edward urged prompt settlement in bookland and folkland disputes, and his legislation established that jurisdiction belonged to the king and his officers.

== Later life ==
According to the Anglo-Saxon Chronicle, there was a general submission of rulers in Britain to Edward in 920:

Then [Edward] went from there into the Peak District to Bakewell and ordered a borough to be built in the neighbourhood and manned. And then the king of the Scots and all the people of the Scots, and Rægnald and the sons of Eadwulf (Note: Rægnald was the Norse Viking king of York in southern Northumbria, and Eadwulf was the Anglo-Saxon ruler of northern Northumbria, which was not conquered by the Vikings.) and all who live in Northumbria, both English and Danish, Norsemen and others, and also the king of the Strathclyde Welsh and all the Strathclyde Welsh, chose him as father and lord.

This passage was regarded as a straightforward report by most historians until the late twentieth century, and Frank Stenton observed that "each of the rulers named in this list had something definite to gain from an acknowledgement of Edward's overlordship." Since the 1980s this submission has been viewed with increasing scepticism, particularly as the passage in the Chronicle is the only evidence for it, unlike other submissions such as that one in 927 to Æthelstan, for which there is independent support from literary sources and coins. Alfred Smyth points out that Edward was not in a position to impose the same conditions on the Scots and the Northumbrians as he could on conquered Vikings, and argues that the Chronicle presented a treaty between kings as a submission to Wessex. Stafford observes that the rulers had met at Bakewell on the border between Mercia and Northumbria, and that meetings on borders were generally considered to avoid any implication of submission by either side. Davidson points out that the wording "chosen as father and lord" applied to conquered army groups and burhs, not relations with other kings. In his view:

The idea that this meeting represented a "submission", while it must remain a possibility, does however seem unlikely. The textual context of the chronicler's passage makes his interpretation of the meeting suspect, and ultimately, Edward was in no position to force the subordination of, or dictate terms to, his fellow kings in Britain.

Edward continued Æthelflæd's policy of founding burhs in the north-west, at Thelwall and Manchester in 919, and Cledematha (Rhuddlan) at the mouth of the River Clwyd in North Wales in 921.

Nothing is known of his relations with the Mercians between 919 and the last year of his life, when he put down a Mercian and Welsh revolt at Chester. Mercia and the eastern Danelaw were organised into shires at an unknown date in the tenth century, ignoring traditional boundaries, and historians such as Sean Miller and David Griffiths suggest that Edward's imposition of direct control from 919 is a likely context for a change which ignored Mercian sensibilities. Resentment at the changes, at the imposition of rule by distant Wessex, and at fiscal demands by Edward's reeves, may have provoked the revolt at Chester. He died at the royal estate of Farndon, twelve miles south of Chester, on 17 July 924, shortly after putting down the revolt, and was buried in the New Minster, Winchester. In 1109, the New Minster was moved outside the city walls to become Hyde Abbey, and the following year the remains of Edward and his parents were translated to the new church.

== Reputation ==
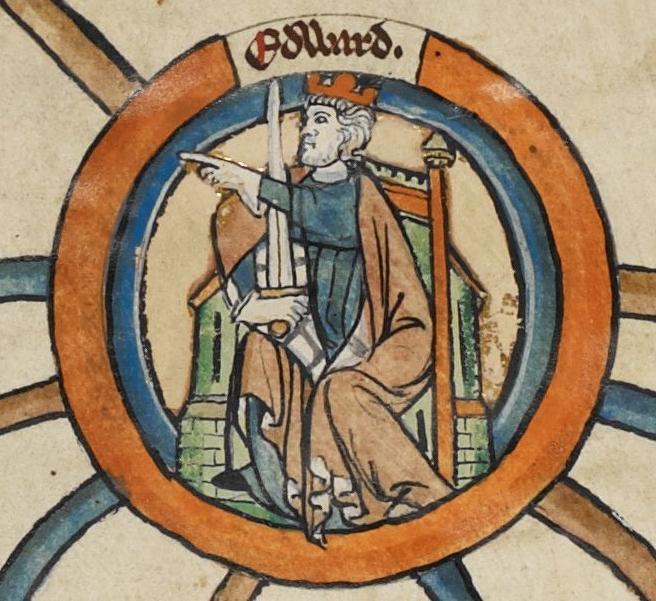
Portrait miniature from a thirteenth-century genealogical scroll depicting Edward

According to William of Malmesbury, Edward was "much inferior to his father in the cultivation of letters", but "incomparably more glorious in the power of his rule". Other medieval chroniclers expressed similar views, and he was generally seen as inferior in book learning, but superior in military success. John of Worcester described him as "the most invincible King Edward the Elder". However, even as war leader he was only one of a succession of successful kings; his achievements were overshadowed because he did not have a famous victory like Alfred's at Edington and Æthelstan's at the Battle of Brunanburh, and William of Malmesbury qualified his praise of Edward by saying, "The chief prize of victory, in my judgment, is due to his father." (Note: All quotations in this paragraph are from Higham, "Edward the Elder's Reputation: An Introduction", pp. 2–3) Edward has also been overshadowed by chroniclers' admiration for his highly regarded sister, Æthelflæd.

A principal reason for the neglect of Edward is that very few primary sources for his reign survive, whereas there are many for Alfred. He was largely ignored by historians until the late twentieth century, but he is now highly regarded. He is described by Keynes as "far more than the bellicose bit between Alfred and Æthelstan", and according to Nick Higham: "Edward the Elder is perhaps the most neglected of English kings. He ruled an expanding realm for twenty-five years and arguably did as much as any other individual to construct a single, south-centred, Anglo-Saxon kingdom, yet posthumously his achievements have been all but forgotten." In 1999 a conference on his reign was held at the University of Manchester, and the papers given on this occasion were published as a book in 2001. Prior to this conference, no monographs had been published on Edward's reign, whereas his father has been the subject of numerous biographies and other studies.

Higham summarises Edward's legacy as follows:

Under Edward's leadership, the scale of alternative centres of power diminished markedly: the separate court of Mercia was dissolved; the Danish leaders were in large part brought to heel or expelled; the Welsh princes were constrained from aggression on the borders and even the West Saxon bishoprics divided. Late Anglo-Saxon England is often described as the most centralised polity in western Europe at the time, with its shires, its shire-reeves and its systems of regional courts and royal taxation. If so – and the matter remains debatable – much of that centrality derives from Edward's activities, and he has as good a claim as any other to be considered the architect of medieval England.

Edward's cognomen 'the Elder' was first used in Wulfstan's Life of St Æthelwold at the end of the tenth century, to distinguish him from King Edward the Martyr.

== Marriages and children ==
Edward had about fourteen children from three marriages. (Note: The order in which Edward's children are listed is based on the family tree in Foot's Æthelstan: the First King of England, which shows sons of each wife before daughters. The daughters are listed in their birth order according to William of Malmesbury's Gesta Regum Anglorum.)

Edward first married Ecgwynn around 893. Their children were:

- Æthelstan, King of England 924–939;
- A daughter, perhaps called Edith, married Sihtric, Viking King of York in 926, who died in 927. Possibly Saint Edith of Polesworth (Note: The earliest primary sources do not distinguish whether Sihtric's wife was Æthelstan's full or half sister, and a tradition recorded at Bury in the early twelfth century makes her a daughter of Edward's second wife, Ælfflæd. She is described as the daughter of Edward and Ecgwynn in William of Malmesbury's twelfth century Deeds of the English Kings, and Michael Wood's argument that this is partly based on a lost early life of Æthelstan has been generally accepted. Modern historians follow William of Malmesbury's testimony in showing her as Æthelstan's full sister. William did not know her name, but some late sources name her as Edith or Eadgyth, an identification accepted by some historians. She is also identified in late sources with Saint Edith of Polesworth, a view accepted by Alan Thacker, but dismissed as "dubious" by Sarah Foot, who nevertheless thinks it is likely that she entered the cloister in widowhood.)

Around 900, he married Ælfflæd, daughter of Ealdorman Æthelhelm, probably of Wiltshire. Their children were:

- Ælfweard, died August 924, a month after his father; possibly King of Wessex for that month;
- Edwin, drowned at sea 933;
- Æthelhild, lay sister at Wilton Abbey;
- Eadgifu (died in or after 951), married Charles the Simple, King of the West Franks, c. 918;
- Eadflæd, nun at Wilton Abbey;
- Eadhild, married Hugh the Great, Duke of the Franks in 926;
- Eadgyth (died 946), in 929/30 married Otto I, Holy Roman Emperor, future King of the East Franks, and (after Eadgyth's death) Holy Roman Emperor;
- Ælfgifu or Edgiva, married "a prince near the Alps", perhaps Louis, brother of King Rudolph II of Burgundy.

Edward married for a third time, around 919, Eadgifu, the daughter of Sigehelm, Ealdorman of Kent. Their children were:

- Edmund I, King of England 939–946
- Eadred, King of England 946–955
- Eadburh (died c. 952), Benedictine nun at Nunnaminster, Winchester, and saint
- Eadgifu, existence uncertain, possibly the same person as Ælfgifu

== Genealogy ==
Ancestors of Edward the Elder

8. Ecgberht
4. Æthelwulf of Wessex
2. Alfred the Great
10. Oslac
5. Osburga
1. Edward the Elder
6. Æthelred Mucel
3. Ealhswith
7. Eadburh

== Notes ==
Edward the Elder House of Wessex Born: c. 874 Died: 17 July 924
Regnal titles
| Preceded by Alfred the Great | King of the Anglo-Saxons; 26 October 899 – 17 July 924 | Succeeded by Æthelstan |
