= New Minster, Winchester =

Benedictine abbey in Winchester

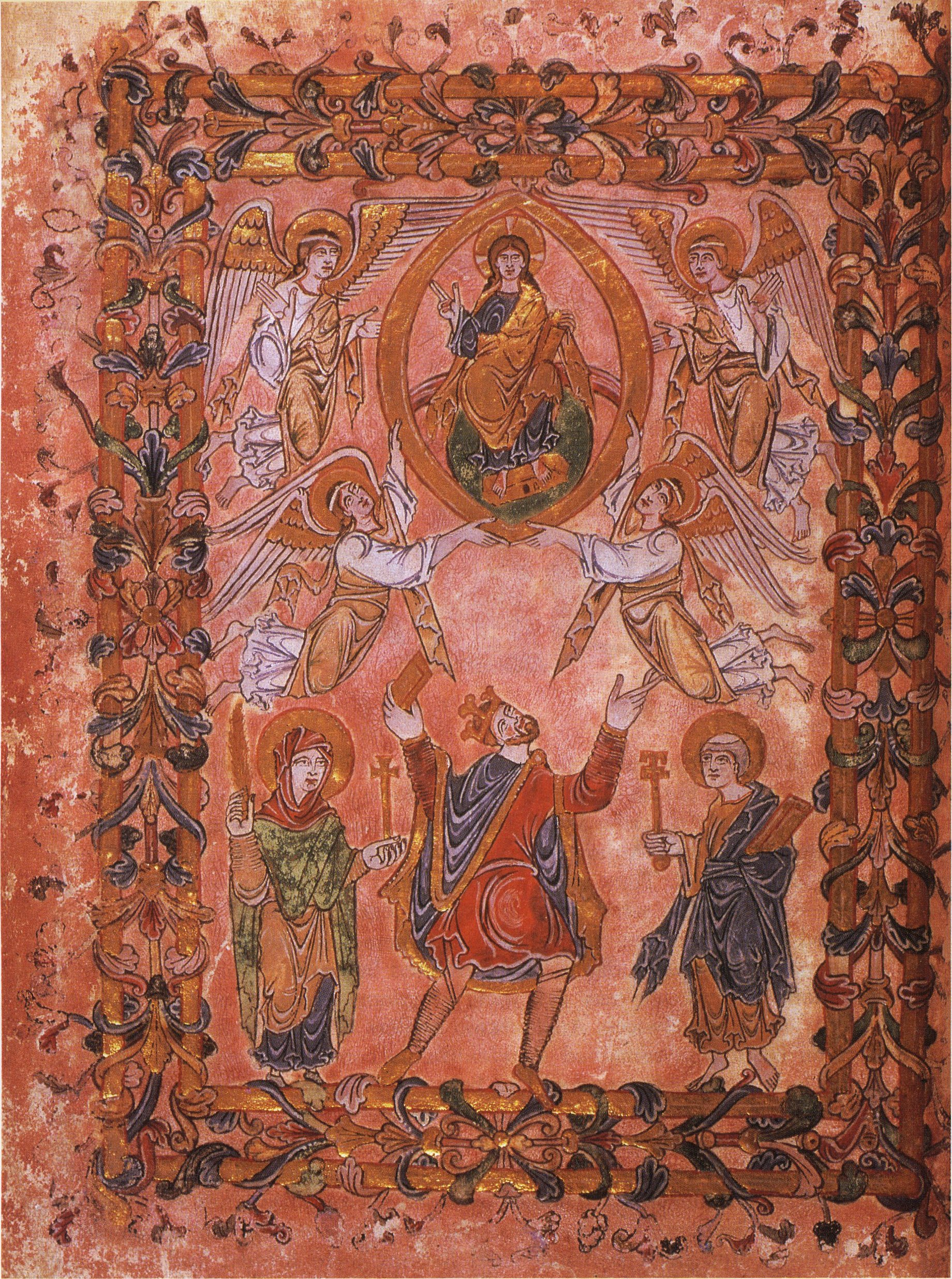
A page from a 966 charter of King Edgar of England in which he confirms the conversion of New Minster, Winchester into a Benedictine monastery. Edgar is pictured here standing between the Virgin Mary and St. Peter.

The New Minster in Winchester was a royal Benedictine abbey founded in 901 (1125 years ago) in Winchester in the English county of Hampshire.

Alfred the Great had intended to build the monastery, but only got around to buying the land. His son, Edward the Elder, finished the project according to Alfred's wishes, with the help of Saint Grimbald who became its first abbot. It stood so close to the Old Minster that the voices of the two choirs merged with chaotic results. The body of King Alfred was transferred to the New Minster, Saint Grimbald joined him and it was also given the body of the Breton Saint Judoc (Saint Josse), making it an important pilgrimage centre. It became a Benedictine house in 963.

According to John of Worcester, in 972 King Edgar "ordered the church of the New Minster, begun by his father King Edmund, but completed by himself, to be solemnly dedicated". It is not known what parts of the church were rebuilt. Queen Emma added the head of Saint Valentine in 1041. With the building of the new cathedral at Winchester after the Norman Conquest of England, the monks of New Minster were obliged to move to Hyde Mead just outside the northern city walls, thus founding the Abbey of Hyde.

== Burials ==
- Alfred the Great
- Ealhswith
- Saint Grimbald
- Edward the Elder
- Ælfweard of Wessex
- Eadwig
