= Eadgifu of Kent =

Consort of Edward the Elder from 919 to 924

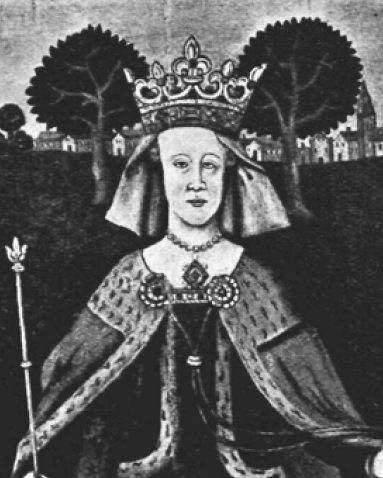
- Fifteenth century picture of Eadgifu in Canterbury Cathedral

Consort of the King of the Anglo-Saxons
- Tenure: c. 919 – 17 July 924
- Born: c. 902/903
- Died: c. 968 (aged 64–66)
- Spouse: Edward the Elder
- Issue: Edmund I, King of the English; Eadred, King of the English; Eadburh; Eadgifu
- Father: Sigehelm

Eadgifu of Kent (also Edgiva or Ediva; in or before 903 – in or after 966) was the third wife of Edward the Elder, King of Wessex.

== Family background ==
Eadgifu was the daughter of Sigehelm, Ealdorman of Kent, who died at the Battle of the Holme in 902.

== Married life ==
Eadgifu married Edward in about 919 and became the mother of two sons, Edmund I of England, later King Edmund I, and Eadred of England, later King Eadred, and two daughters, Saint Eadburh of Winchester and Eadgifu. She survived Edward by many years, dying in the reign of her grandson Edgar.

== Lands of Cooling ==
According to a charter issued by Eadgifu in the early 960s (S 1211), her father, Sigehelm, had given Cooling in Kent to a man called Goda as security for a loan of thirty pounds. The charter claims that Sigehelm had repaid the loan prior to departing for the Battle of the Holme, bequeathing the land to Eadgifu. Goda denied receiving payment and refused to surrender the estate, despite the decision of the witan that Eadgifu could claim it should she swear a public oath as to her father's repayment (which she did at Aylesford). Eadgifu attained possession of Cooling six years after her father's death, when her friends persuaded King Edward to intervene. Edward ultimately declared Goda's lands forfeit and gave all the charters of ownership to Eadgifu. However, she returned almost all the estates to Goda, an act which Matthew Firth argues was driven by Eadgifu's desire to avoid ongoing conflict with a powerful political rival. She did, however, retain the lands at Cooling and another estate at place called Osterland, as well as all of Goda's charters. Some time after this her marriage to Edward took place. After Edward's death, Goda asked King Æthelstan to intercede with Eadgifu, who subsequently returned the charters to Goda but retained the Cooling and Osterland estates.

== Court life ==
She disappeared from court during the reign of her step-son, King Æthelstan, but she was prominent and influential during the reign of her two sons and attested many of their charters. In charter S 562, a grant to her by Eadred of land at Felpham in Sussex issued in 953, she is described as famula Dei, suggesting that she may have taken religious vows while continuing to live on her own estates. Given that the estate at Felpham had come into the ownership of Shaftesbury Abbey by the time of the Domesday Survey in the 1080s, Susan Kelly suggests Eadgifu may have become an associate of that house.

Following the death of her younger son Eadred in 955, she was deprived of her lands (or at least those that has been disputed with Goda) by her eldest grandson, King Eadwig. This may have been because she took the side of his younger brother, Edgar, in the succession dispute between their factions. When Edgar succeeded on Eadwig's death in 959 she recovered some lands and received generous gifts from her grandson, but she never returned to her prominent position at court. She is last appears in the historical record as a witness to charter S 745, the New Minster, Winchester refoundation charter, in 966.

She was known as a supporter of reforming churchmen and appears in the hagiographies of St Dunstan, the archbishop of Canterbury, and St Æthelwold, the bishop of Winchester. She was also a known benefactor of churches, granting the estates at Cooling and Osterland to Christ Church Canterbury once she regained them in Edgar's reign, and gifting lands to Abingdon and Ely abbeys.

== Death and burial ==
Eadgifu was buried in Canterbury Cathedral, having died on 25 August 968 in the reign of her grandson Edgar.

== See also ==
- House of Wessex family tree

== Notes ==
Preceded by Ælfflæd	Consort of the King of the Anglo-Saxons; 919–924	Succeeded by Ælfgifu of Shaftesbury
