= Hugh Easton =

British stained glass artist (1906–1965)

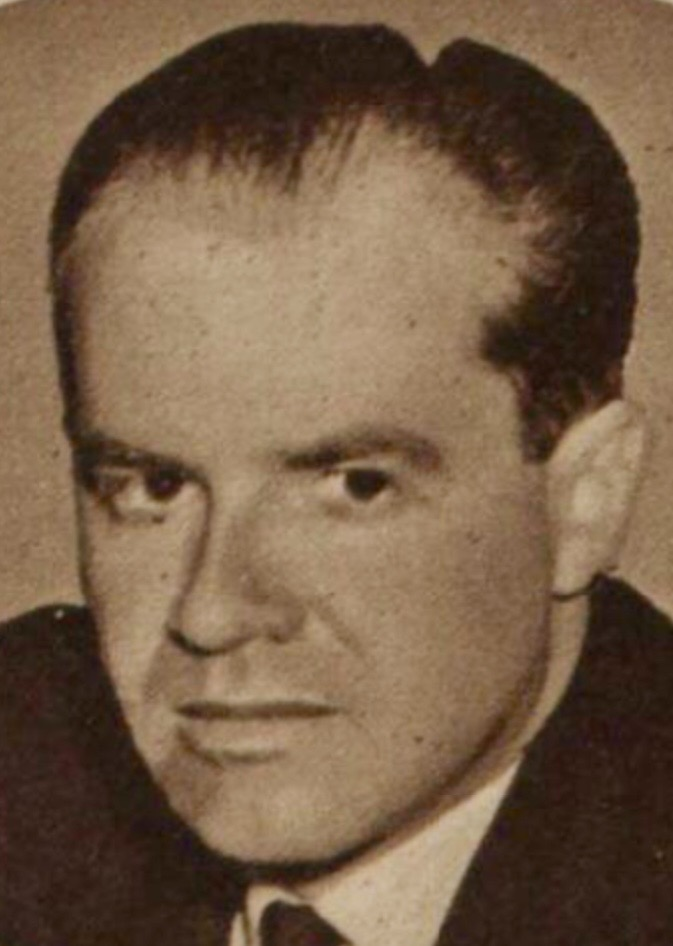
- Hugh Easton in 1944

Personal details
- Born: Hugh Ray Easton; 28 November 1906 Marylebone, London, United Kingdom
- Died: August 15, 1965 (aged 58) King Edward VII Hospital for Officers, London, United Kingdom
- Resting place: St Giles's Church, Bradford-on-Tone, Somerset, United Kingdom
- Occupation: Stained‑glass artist
- Known for: Battle of Britain memorial window, Westminster Abbey

Military service
- Branch: Royal Navy
- Rank: Commander
- Unit: Royal Naval Volunteer Reserve
- Conflicts: Second World War

Hugh Easton (28 November 1906 – 15 August 1965) was a British stained glass artist of the mid-20th century, best known for his prolific work in the years following the Second World War. His many memorial windows for Church of England buildings blend traditional religious iconography with contemporary context. His best-known work is the 1947 Battle of Britain memorial window in the Henry VII Chapel at Westminster Abbey in London.

== Early life and education ==
Hugh Ray Easton was born in Marylebone, London on 28 November 1906 to Dr Frank Easton and Alice Howland. His father was a general practitioner. In 1920 he was admitted to Wellington College in Crowthorne, Berkshire where he failed to distinguish himself, even in the field of art (In 1953 Easton would design 11 windows for the school chapel). It was only while studying French at the University of Tours after the end of the First World War that Easton developed an interest in church architecture and stained glass, developing an aptitude in drawing and painting as he recorded what he saw.

== Early career ==
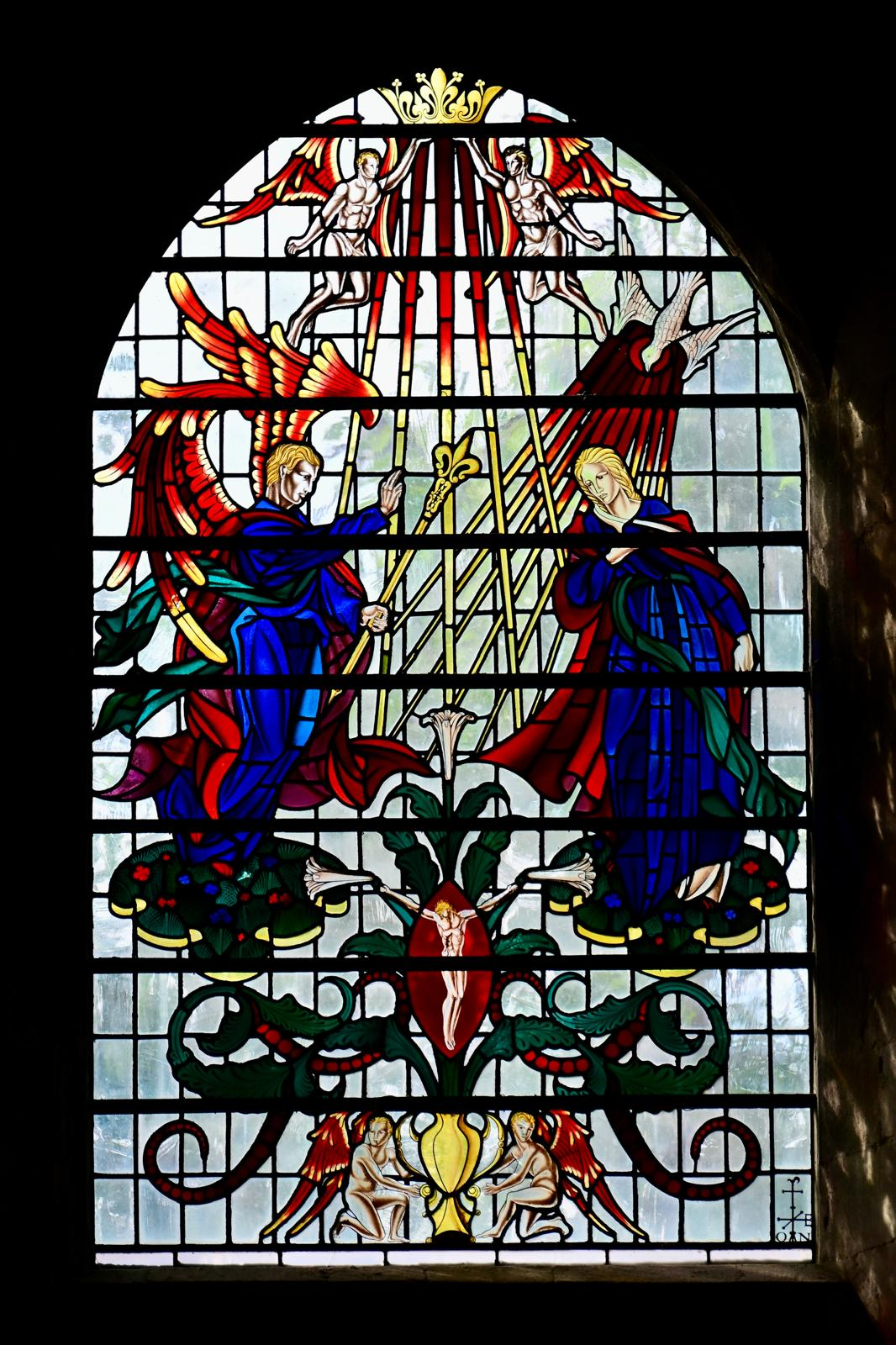
Annunciation window, Romsey Abbey (1930)

On returning to England in 1925, aged 19, Easton began an apprenticeship with the architectural and church furnishing practice of William Henry Randoll Blacking in Guildford. It was under Blacking's tutelage that Easton adopted the guiding principle that a decorated window should avoid darkening the interior of the building in which it is installed.

In 1930, Easton established an independent practice in Cambridge, where he would remain until the outbreak of the Second World War in 1939. Though not a student of the University of Cambridge himself, Easton's diaries record the relationships he cultivated among artistically minded undergraduates, including Anthony Blunt and Guy Burgess.

Easton's earliest independent commission appears to be for Romsey Abbey, a single-light window of the Annunciation installed in 1930, which considering Easton's inexperience is notable for its modernity. It already includes the Weather vane rebus that Easton would retain throughout his professional life. However, at the outset, Easton's practice was not exclusively concerned with the production of designs for windows. Notably, in 1932, Easton was commissioned to redesign a pre-existing chapel in the Church of St Philip the Apostle and All Saints, in North Sheen, Surrey, into a Lady Chapel, the focal point of which was a bas-relief reredos that Easton carved himself.

Nevertheless, it was commissions for stained glass designs that bought Easton the most commercial success. In 1935 his design was chosen for a memorial window for Exeter Cathedral in memory of Hugh, 4th Earl Fortescue. The window, which depicted St George and St Hubert, was destroyed during the Exeter Blitz in 1942. In 1956 it was replaced with a new window, also designed by Easton.

In 1935, Easton completed the first of seven windows for the east wall of the chapter house at Durham Cathedral, and would win commissions for three more windows at Durham before the end of the decade, although only a three-light depiction of Gregory of Nazianzus would be installed before the outbreak of the Second World War. Windows depicting St Cuthbert and St Oswald, King of Northumbria, would not be installed until 1945, with Easton's Royal Air Force memorial window for the cathedral following in 1948.

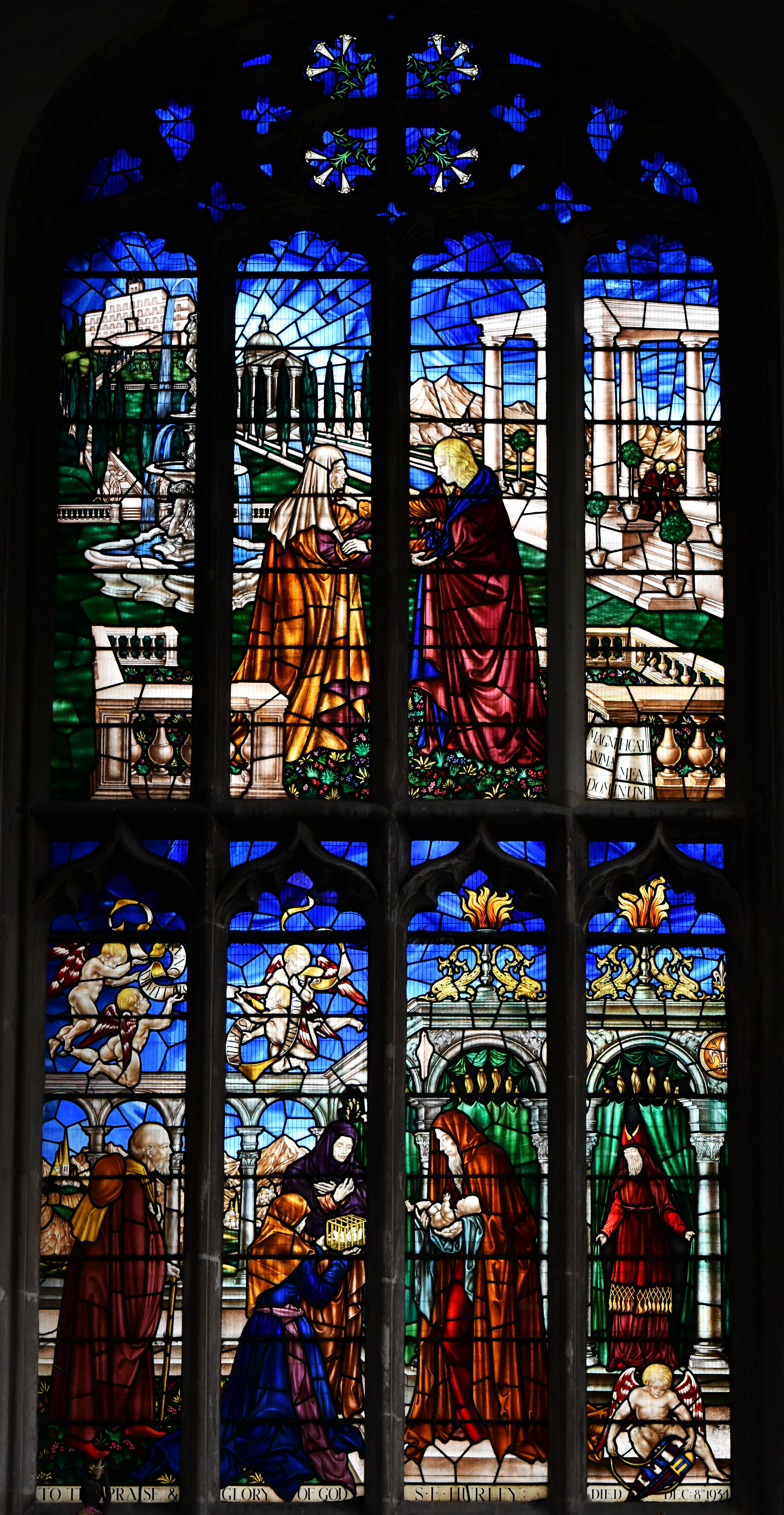
Annunciation and the Adoration of the Maji, St Mary's Church, Burwell (1936)

Eaton's 1936 window for St Mary's Church, Burwell, which depicts the Annunciation and the Adoration of the Maji, won specific praise from the architect and critic Theodore Fyfe. The same year he also won the commission to replace two windows by William Wailes in the chapel of Clare College, Cambridge, which had been deemed too dark and heavy, and designed the new west window for the Church of St Paul in King's Cross, Halifax. The subject of the latter is St John's vision of the New Jerusalem, beneath which ride the Four Horsemen of the Apocalypse and a detailed panorama of Halifax standing in for the Holy City itself.

In 1938 Easton completed three 20-foot windows for the eastern apse of Ypres Cathedral in Belgium, depicting St Martin, St Maurice and St Michael. He was also commissioned by the Worshipful Company of Glaziers and Painters of Glass - to whom he had been attached as a liveryman since 1935 - to produce a window for Tonbridge School Chapel. The following year the Company commissioned two paired windows from Easton for Winchester Cathedral, one a memorial to George V and the second commemorating the coronation of George VI.

== War service ==
Easton’s career was interrupted by the Second World War. By 1942 he was serving in the Royal Naval Volunteer Reserve and attached to the press division based at the Admiralty, where he served as naval advisor to the Censorship Division of the Ministry of Information. However, he did not stop his design work altogether and continued to seek commissions. In May 1944, having attained the rank of Commander, Easton won the commission to design the national Battle of Britain memorial window, which was to be positioned in the newly established Royal Air Force Chapel within Henry VII's Chapel in Westminster Abbey. Work on the manufacture of the window would not begin in earnest until after the end of the War, by which time Easton had relocated his studio to Hampstead in North London.

== Post-war success ==
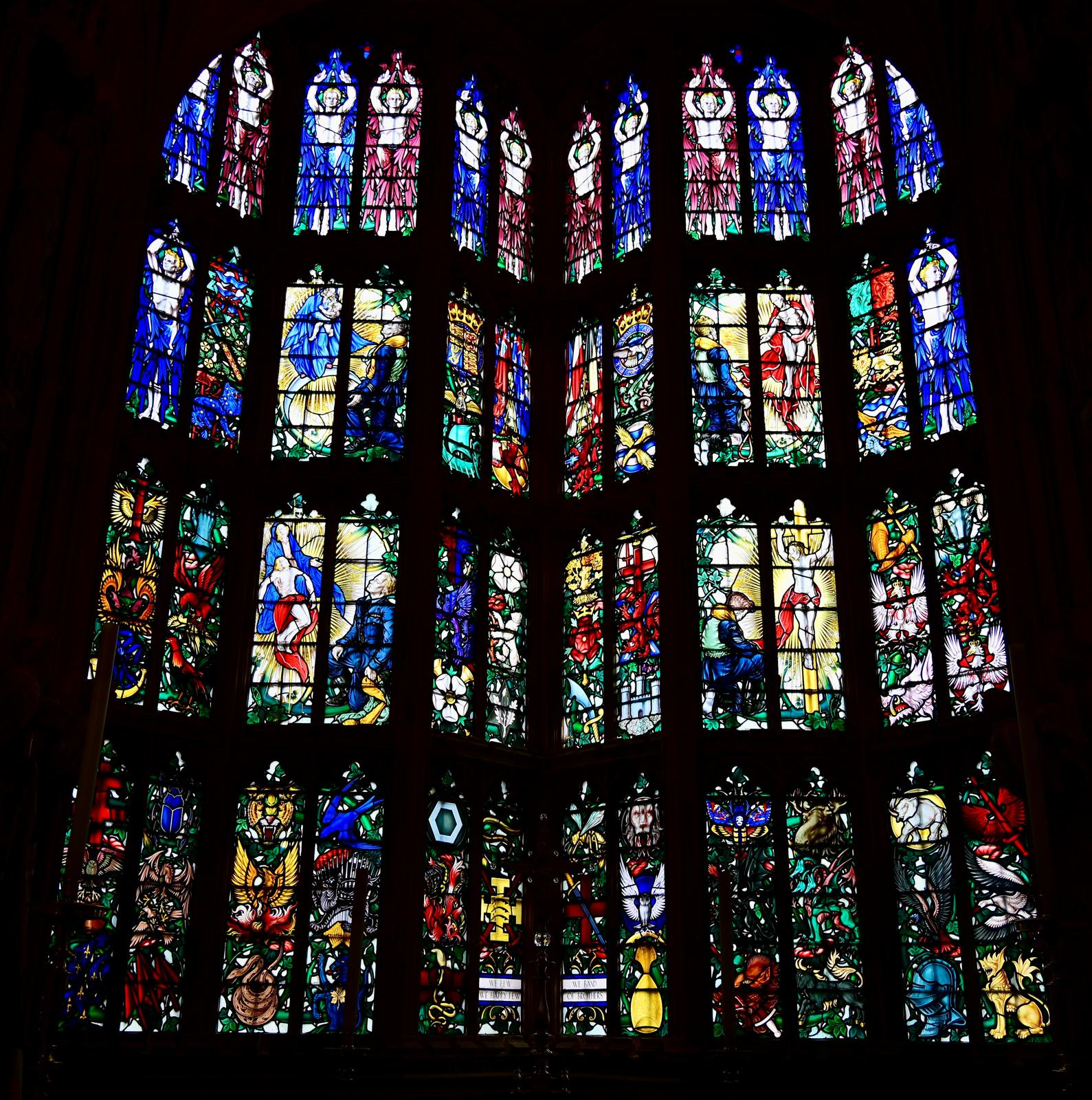
Battle of Britain memorial window, Westminster Abbey (1947)

Unveiled on 10 July 1947, the Battle of Britain memorial window in Westminster Abbey instantly became Easton's best-known work, which it remains to this day. In his 2003 biography of Easton for the Journal of the Society of Master Glass Makers, Adam Goodyear notes that Easton's aim for the window was to:

"…create in glass a jewelled curtain of such brilliance as to be a translucent painting, a fresco shot through by flames, taking its place in the richness of the Henry VIl's Chapel. Each light in its own way tells the story of the Battle of Britain, each light has its own meaning, but the whole is subservient to the architectural frame."

Contemporary reaction to the window was not universally positive. John Betjeman declared himself to be 'horrified' by the window. Nevertheless, within a month of its unveiling, Easton secured a commission from Rolls-Royce for a large window for the foyer of their factory in Derby, a memorial to work of the company and its employees in providing the engines for thousands of RAF aeroplanes during the War. Easton's design depicts an RAF pilot in flying uniform standing atop a propeller, behind which can be seen the buildings of the Rolls-Royce factory.

In 1950 Easton moved his studio again, this time to Chelsea in West London. With the rebuilding and refurbishment of hundreds of bomb-damaged church buildings underway, the forthcoming years would prove to be commercially fruitful for Easton. Commissions included 13 windows for St George's Church at the Royal Naval Barracks, Chatham (1950); seven windows for the chapel of Oundle School (1950); eleven windows for Wellington College (1953); and twelve windows for St George's Chapel, Biggin Hill (1955). 1955 also saw the unveiling of the Easton's glass for the monumental west window of Holy Trinity Church in Coventry, a strikingly modern window in the context of the Gothic church in which it was installed.

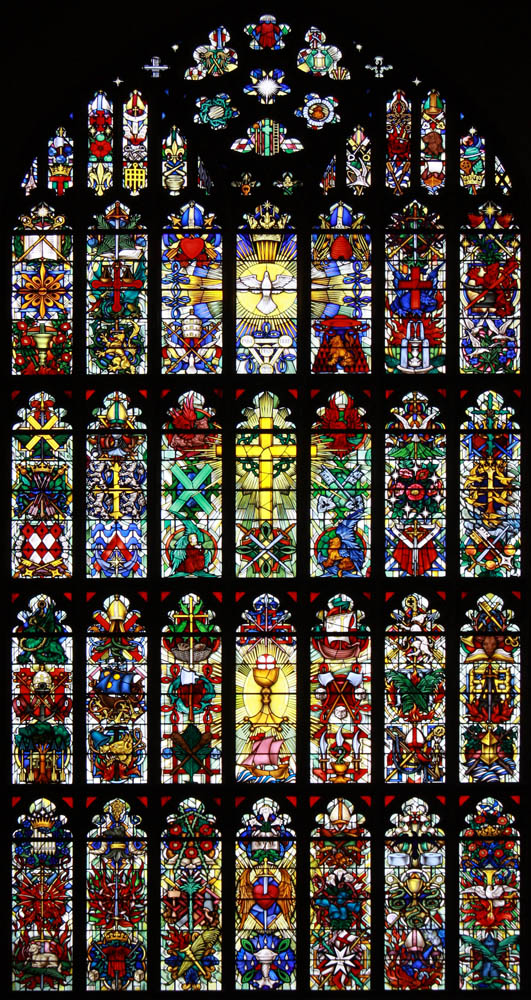
East window, St Luke's Church, Chelsea (1959)

Among Easton's final major commissions was the east window for St Luke's Church in Chelsea, at the time said to be the largest window installed in a London church since the end of the Second World War. Dedicated in 1959, its heraldic design incorporates the symbols and devices of the Evangelists, Apostles and Doctors of the Church, as well as those of 105 other saints.

== Death ==
In 1960 Easton was diagnosed with cancer of the hip. While he did not immediately retire, his pace of work slowed and he began to accept fewer commissions. Easton died at the King Edward VII Hospital for Officers, London, on 15 August 1965, aged 58. A memorial service was held in the Henry VII Chapel in Westminster Abbey in front of his Battle of Britain window. Easton's ashes were interred in the family plot at St Giles's Church, Bradford-on-Tone, where two years later, a memorial window designed by Easton's former apprentice and long time collaborator Gerald Coles was unveiled.

== Style and technique ==
Easton’s style has been likened to a "neo-Renaissance" sensibility that deliberately departed from the medievalist Arts and Crafts aesthetic prevalent in early 20th-century British glass. He frequently employed a light, airy palette, making extensive use of clear glass in an attempt to avoid darkening the interiors of the buildings in which they were installed. Unlike contemporaries such as John Haywood and Harry Stammers, Easton's practice focused exclusively on design rather than the manufacture of his windows. Rather than executing the physical glass-cutting, painting and leading himself, Easton forged long-term collaborative partnerships with craftsmen including the glass painters Robert Hendra and Geoffrey Harper, who translated his highly detailed cartoons into the finished medium, and the father-and-son master glassmakers, T. G. and Denis Harris.

== Legacy ==
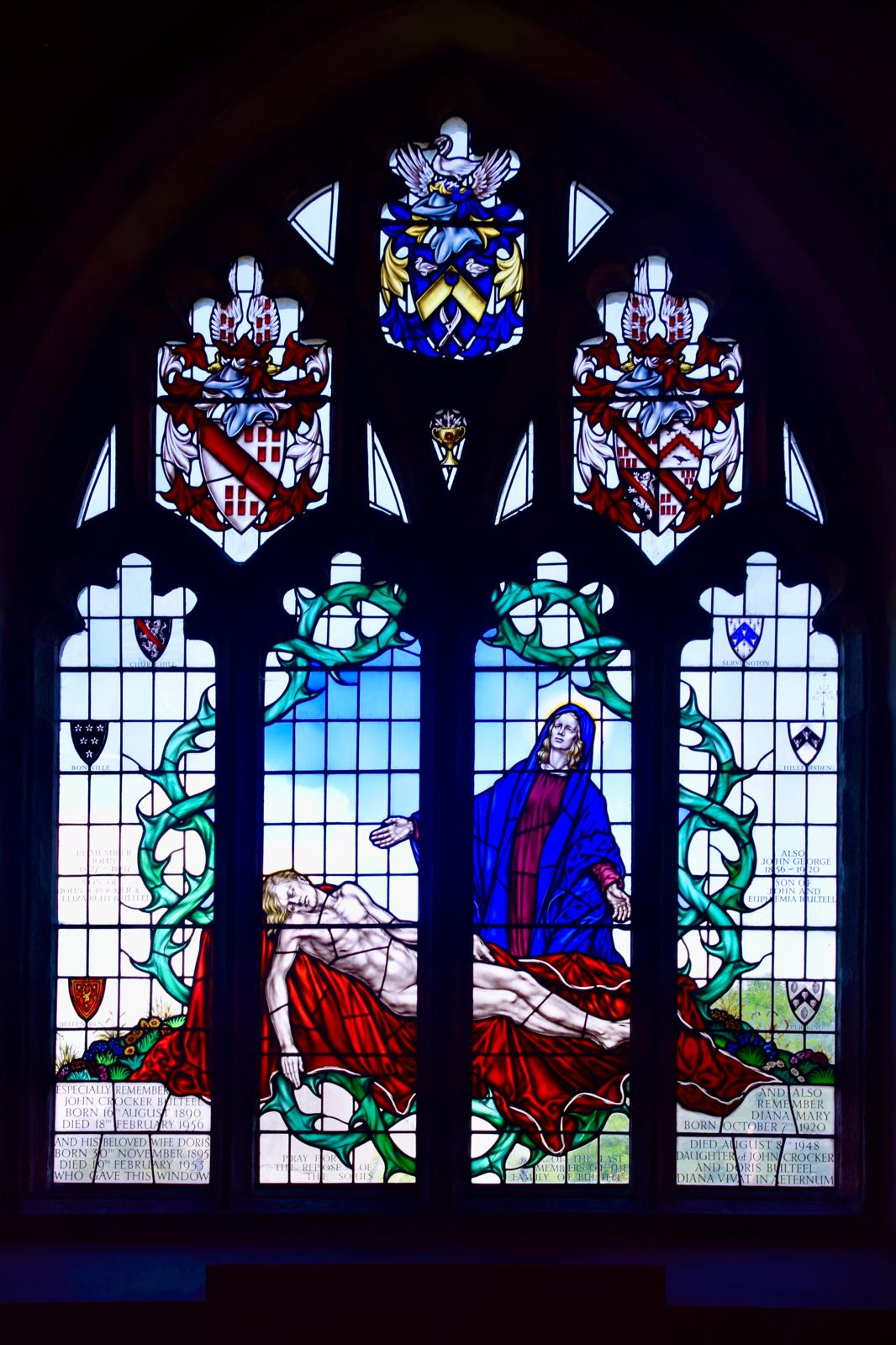
Lamentation window, All Saints' Church, Holbeton (1959)

Easton's work has been noted for its high degree of narrative clarity, often featuring figures in contemporary dress, particularly military uniform. During the immediate post-war period, this sensibility found significant favour with both the public and institutional patrons who appreciated Easton's legible, heroic, and patriotic imagery. In this regard his designs have been interpreted as a bridge between the Gothic revivalist practice of his Victorian and early 20th-century forebears and the onset of mid-century modernism that favoured clarity and optimism, manifested in the UK as the Festival of Britain style.

However, among critics, Easton's work would prove divisive. Contemporary critical reception split both along generational and ideological lines, though sometimes received a negative reception from both sides - traditionalists such as John Betjeman were quick to point out the inappropriateness of his style when used in sacred Gothic settings. At the same time, Easton's work was frequently dismissed as sentimental and old fashioned in comparison to the modernist style of younger contemporaries such as John Hayward. The enduring authority of critics such as Nikolaus Pevsner, whose modernist bias left little room for Easton's style, means that his reputation continues to be somewhat diminished.

== Selected works ==
- Romsey Abbey, Hampshire
  - Annunciation window (1930)
- All Saints' Church, Hockerill, Bishop's Stortford, Hertfordshire
  - Rose window in east wall - Christ in Majesty (1937)
- Canterbury Cathedral, Kent
- "Musicians’ Window in west cloister - four English composers: Purcell, Tallis, Merbecke and Archbishop Stephen Langton (1934)
  - Sheppard memorial window (1939)
- Exeter Cathedral, Devon
  - Fortescue memorial window - St George and St Hubert (1935, destroyed 1942)
  - Fortescue memorial window - St George and the Dragon (1956)
- Durham Cathedral, County Durham
  - Seven windows for the east wall of the chapter house - spiritual scenes and bishops of Durham (c.1935-1938)
  - Blacket memorial window - St Gregory Naxiansen (1936)
  - St Cuthbert on Inner Farne window (1945)
  - Alington memorial window - St Oswald, King of Northumbria (1945)
  - Royal Air Force memorial window - As Birds Flying So Shall the Lord Of Hosts Protect Jerusalem (1948)
- St Mary's Church, Burwell, Cambridgeshire
  - Visitation and Presentation of Christ window (1936)
- Chapel of Clare College, Cambridge
  - Richard de Badew memorial window - Clare College presented to the Virgin and Child (1936)
  - Hugh Latimer and Nicholas Ferrar window (1936)
- St Paul's Church, King's Cross, Halifax
  - Bright memorial window - St John's vision of the New Jerusalem (1936)
- St John the Baptist's Church, Cirencester, Gloucestershire
  - Croome memorial window - Fruit of the Mystic Rose (1937)
- Ypres Cathedral, Belgium
  - Three windows in eastern apse - St Martin, St Maurice and St Michael (1938)
- Winchester Cathedral, Hampshire
  - George V memorial window - George VI in Garter robes (1938)
  - George VI coronation window - George VI and Queen Elizabeth with Henry IV and Joan of Navarre (1939)
- St Andrew's Church, Ham Common, London
  - West window - St Andrew the fisherman (1946)
- Westminster Abbey, London
  - Battle of Britain memorial window in Henry VII's Chapel - 48-lights depicting heavenly Seraphim, scenes of the Passion, squadron badges and airmen (1947)
  - War memorial window in lower Islip Chapel - Abbot Islip before St Margaret of Antioch (1948)
  - Citizens of Westminster memorial window in St Benedict's Chapel - St George and St Michael (1948)
  - Nurses memorial window in the Florence Nightingale memorial chapel - Virgin and Child with St Luke (1950)
  - Two windows for Cheyneygates (1953)
- Church of St Andrew and St Patrick, Elveden, Suffolk
  - USAAF memorial window - American pilot with guardian angel (1947)
  - Viscount Elevdon memorial window - St George and the dragon (1950)
- St Mary's Church, Willingdon, East Sussex
  - War memorial window - Virgin Mary, Christ and Saint George, with servicemen (1947)
- St Cuthbert's Church, Philbeach gardens, London
  - Lady Chapel windows (c.1947)
- Rolls-Royce Main Works, Derby
  - Rolls-Royce Battle of Britain Memorial Window (1948)
- Chapel of St Anthony, Oundle School, Northamptonshire
  - Seven windows - depicting the seven ages of man (1949)
- St Dunstan's Church, Stepney, London
  - East window - Crucifixion with detailed panorama of London's post-Blitz East End (1949)
- St George's Church, Royal Naval Barracks, Chatham, Kent
  - 13 single-light war memorial windows (1950)
- Church of St Bartholomew-the-less, City of London
  - Eastern apse windows - Virgin and Child flanked by St Luke, St Bartholomew and Rahere (c.1950)
- Brechin Cathedral, Angus
  - Wright memorial window - the apostles Bartholomew, Simon the Zealot and Jude (1952)
- Church of Christ the Saviour, Ealing, London
  - East window - Christ as Salvator Mundi (1952)
  - Lady Chapel window - Virgin and Child (1952)
  - Easton memorial window - Annunciation (1952)
- All Saints' Church, Holbeton, Devon
  - Mildmay memorial window - Mary Magdalene at the feet of Christ the Gardner (1952)
  - Bulteel memorial window - Lamentation of the Virgin (1959)
- St Mary's Church, Eastbourne, East Sussex
  - St George and the Dragon window (1953)
- Wellington College, Crowthorne, Berkshire
  - 11 windows depicting Biblical scenes (1953)
- Grimsby Minister, Lincolnshire
  - North transept windows - Archangels Uriel, Gabriel, Raphael, Michael (1954)
  - Franklin memorial window - Creation of the sun, moon and stars (1957)
  - Gibson memorial window - Holy sacrament window (1957)
- St George's Chapel, Biggin Hill, London
  - 17 windows commemorating RAF Squadrons who flew from Biggin Hill in the Second World War (1955)
- Holy Trinity Church, Coventry, West Midlands
  - West window - Christ in Majesty (1955)
- St Luke's Church, Chelsea, London
  - East window - Emblems of the saints (1959)
- Church of St Peter-upon-Cornhill, City of London
  - Two Royal Tank Regiment memorial windows - Cross with abandoned unform, and soldiers witnessing the Resurrection of Jesus (1960)

== Gallery ==
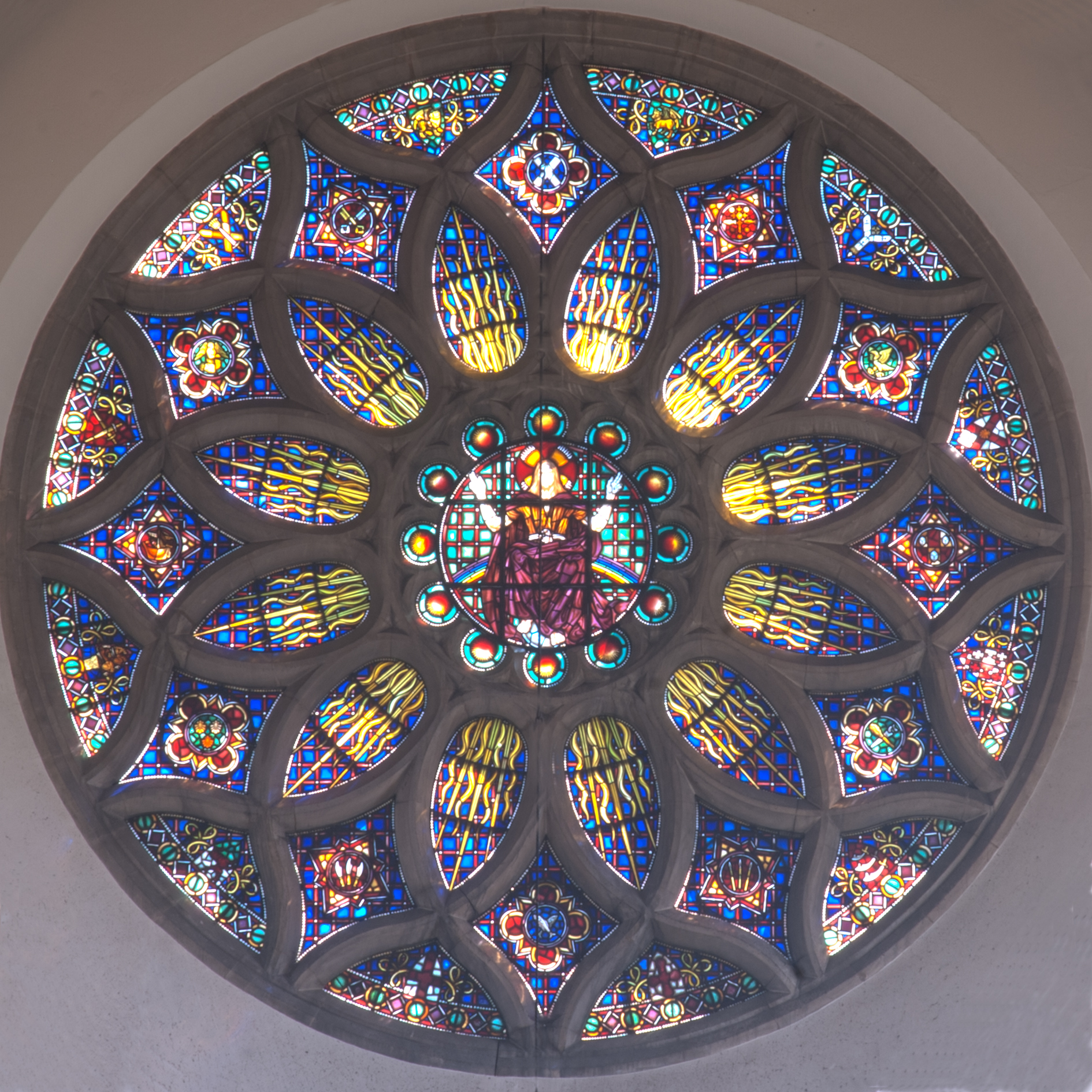
All Saints' Church, Hockerill, Bishop's Stortford, Hertfordshire (1937)

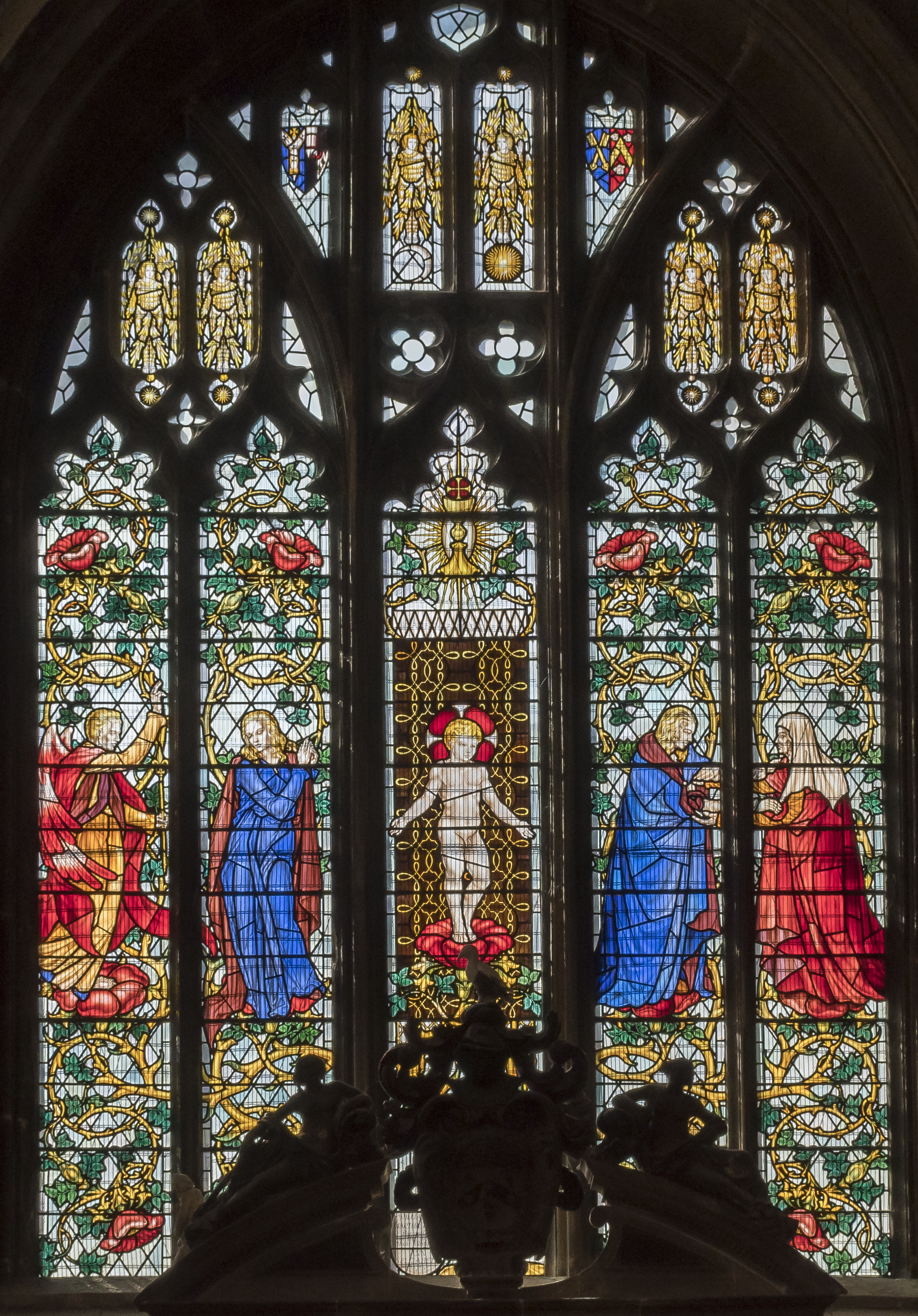
St John the Baptist's Church, Cirencester, Gloucestershire (1937)

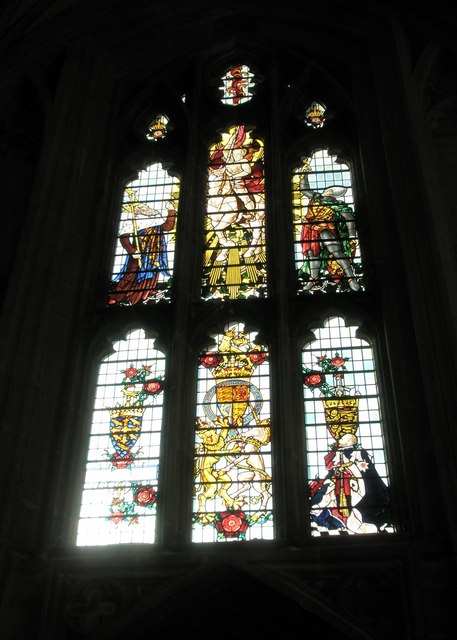
Winchester Cathedral, Hampshire (1938)

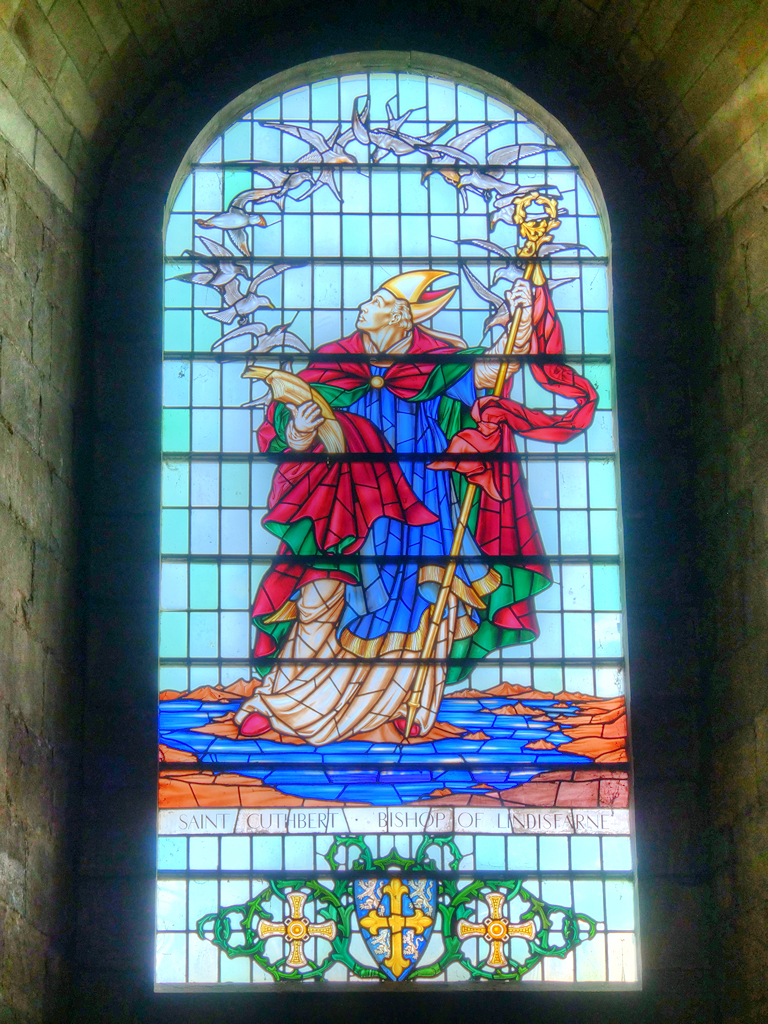
Durham Cathedral, County Durham (1945)

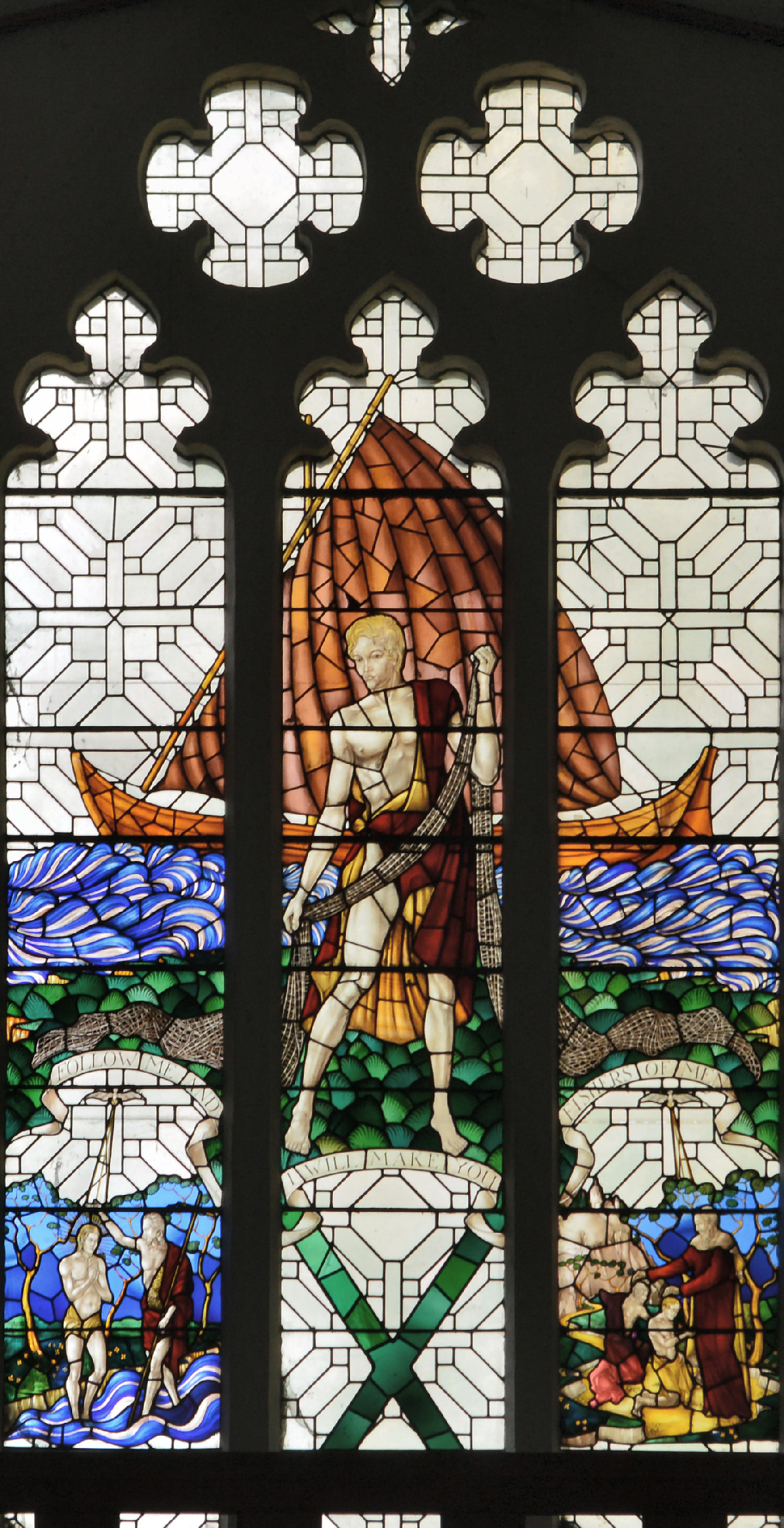
St Andrew's Church, Ham Common, London (1946)

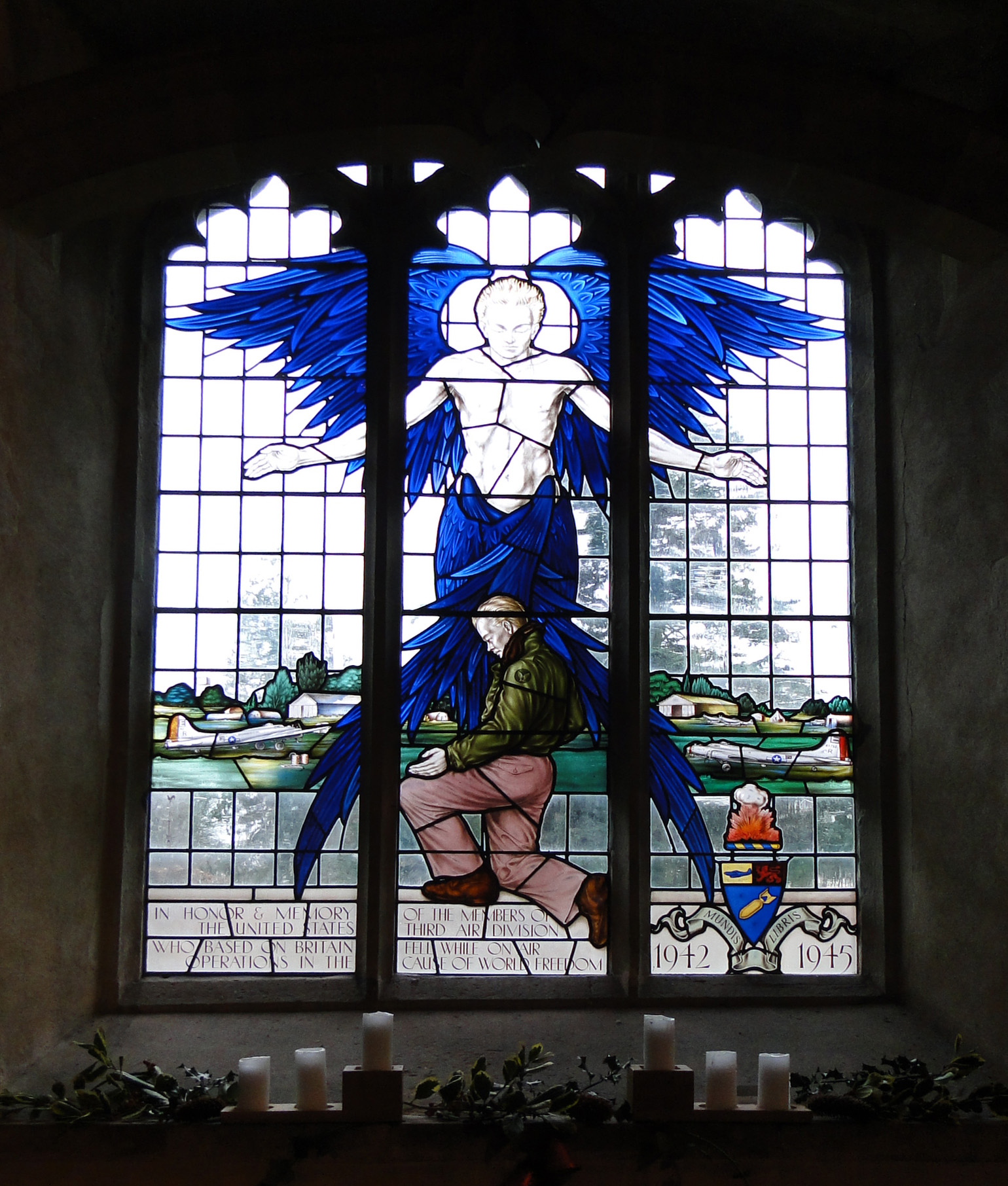
Church of St Andrew and St Patrick, Elveden, Suffolk (1947)

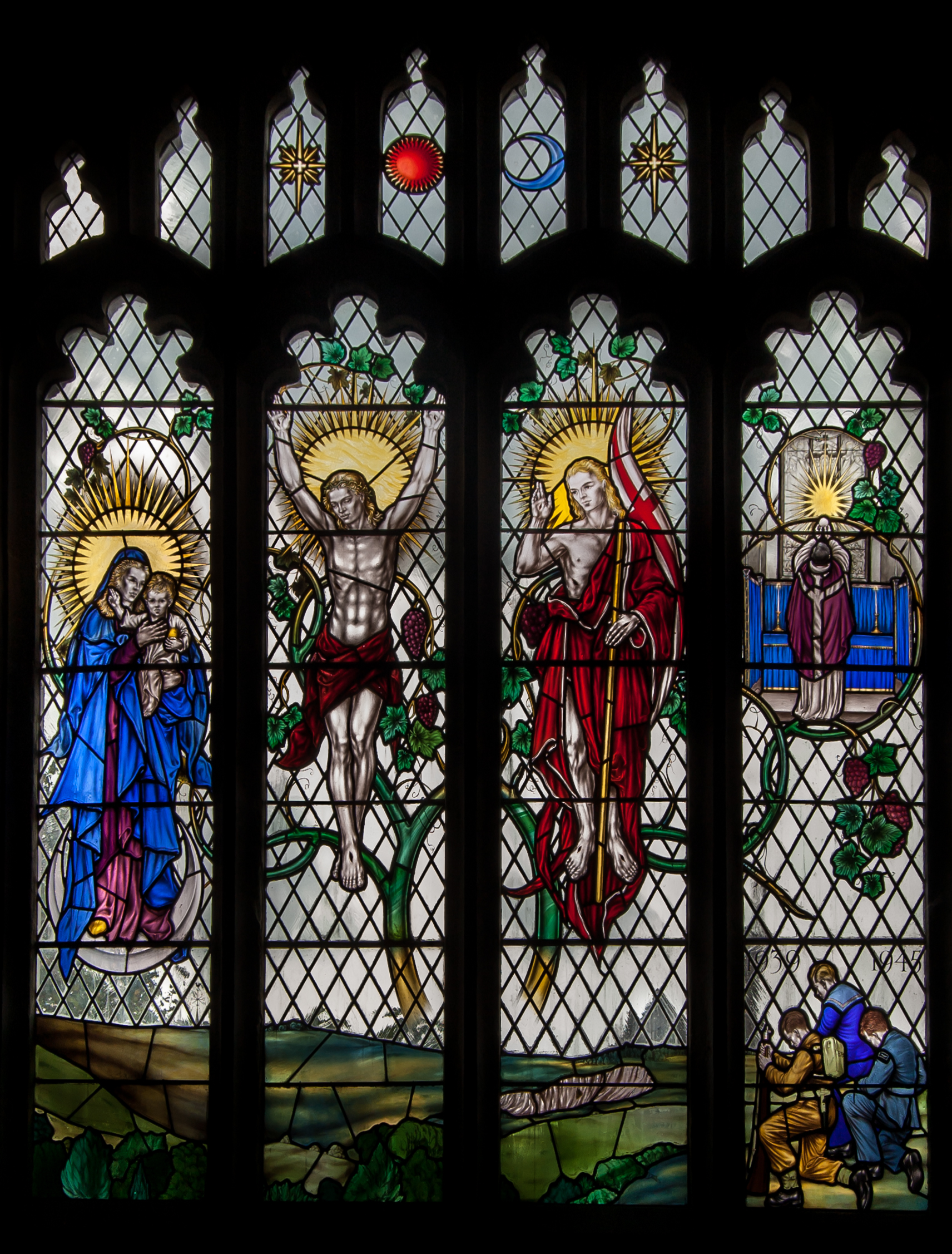
St Mary's Church, Willingdon, East Sussex (1947)

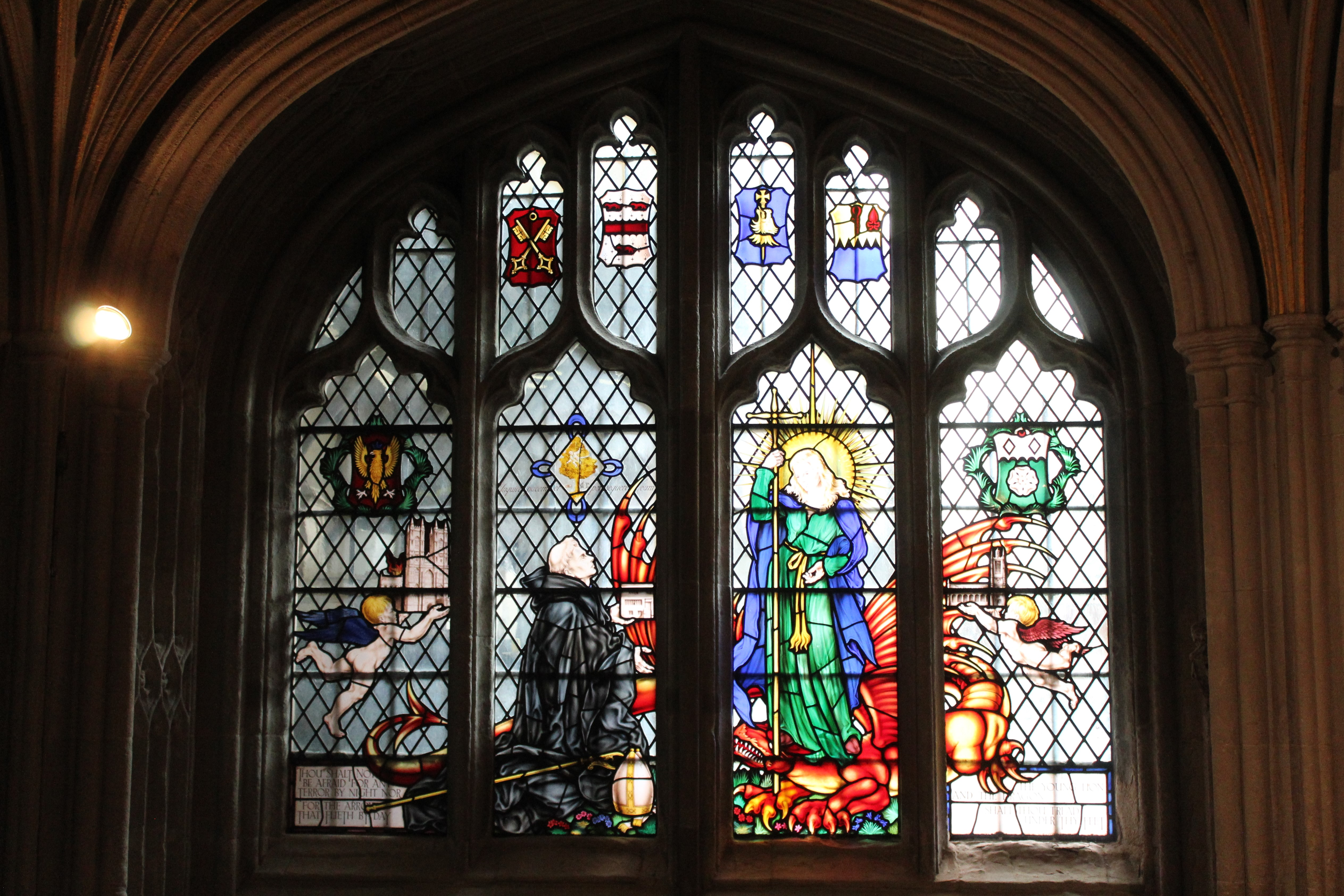
Westminster Abbey, Islip Chapel (1948)

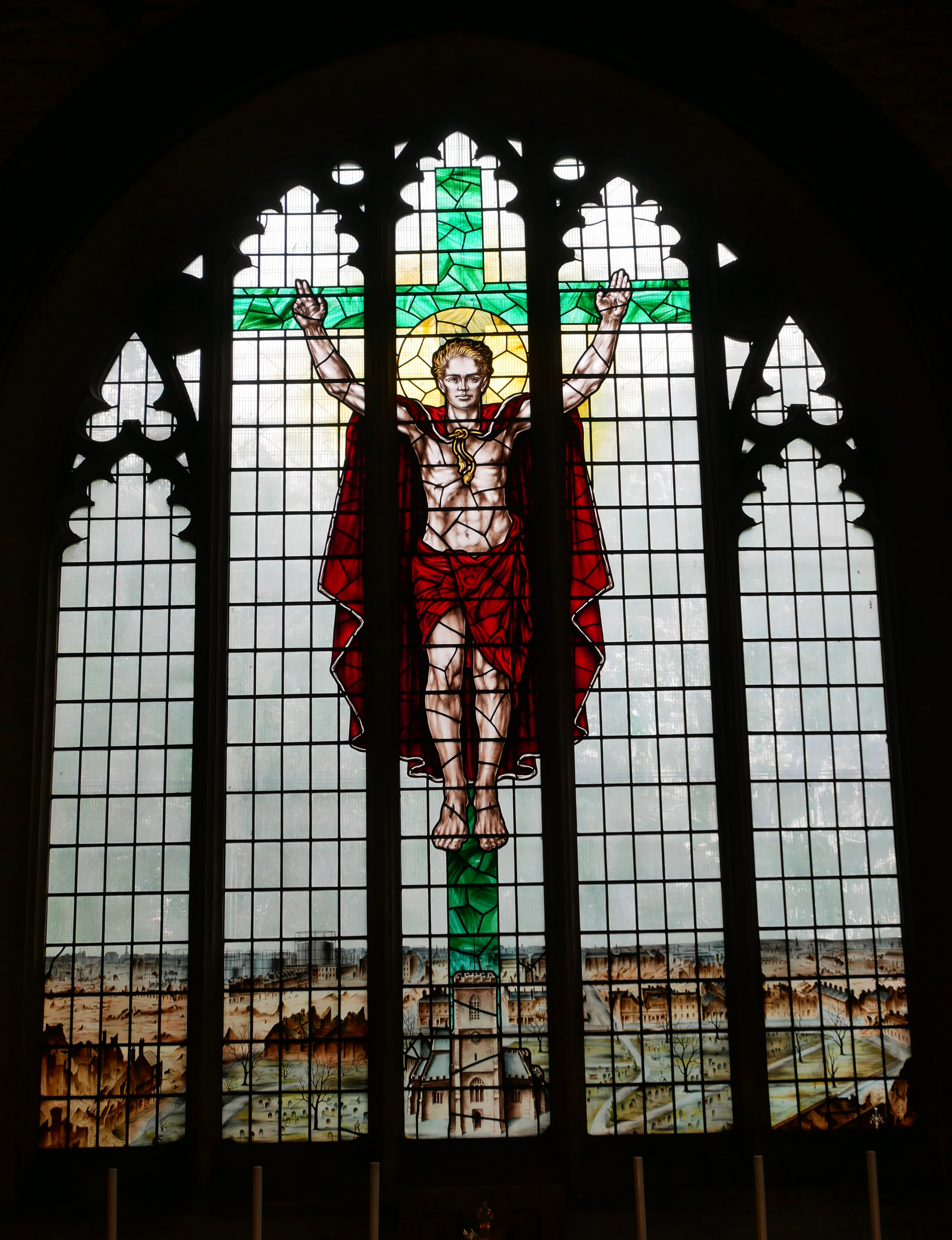
St Dunstan's Church, Stepney, London (1949)

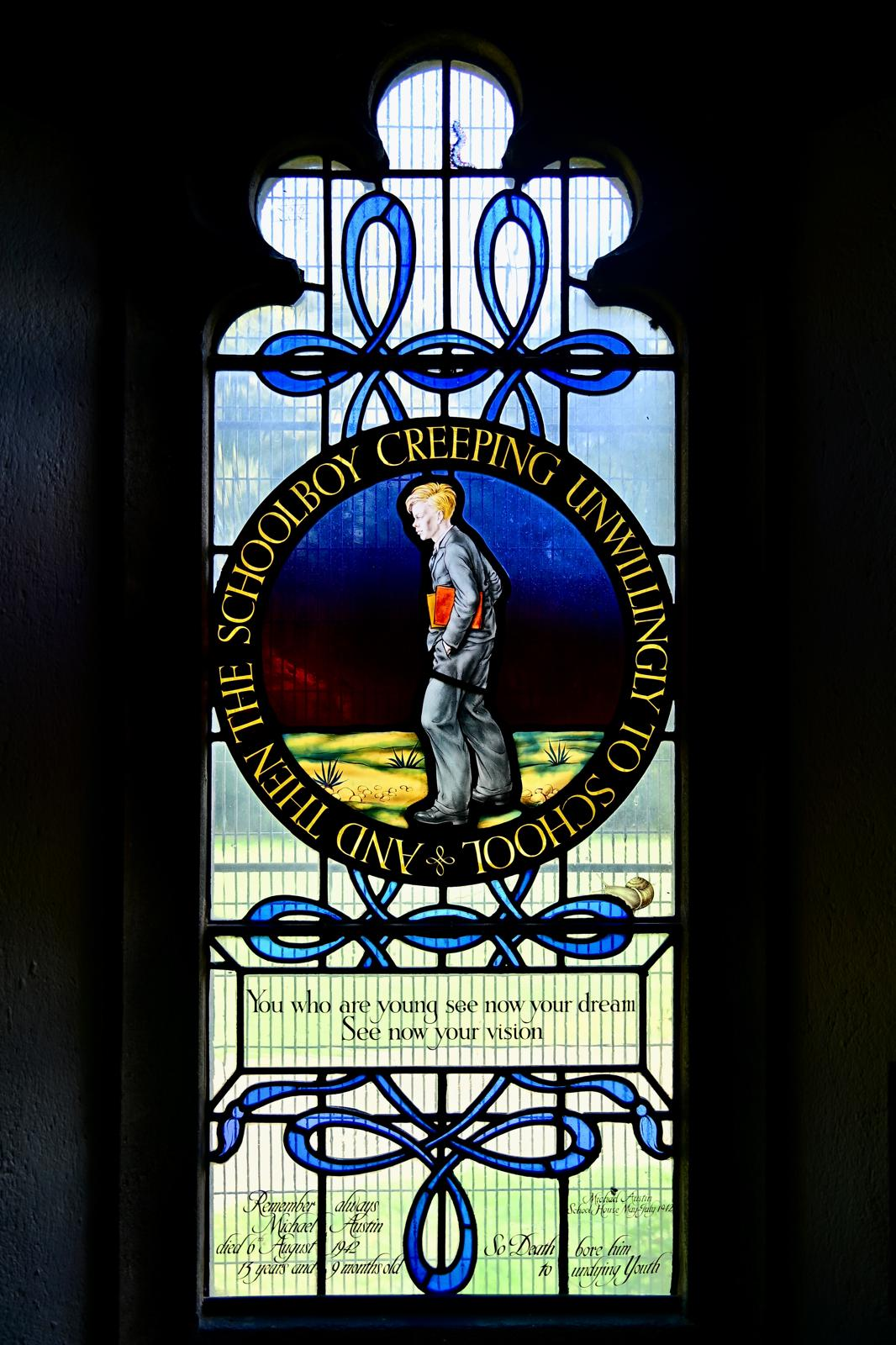
Oundle School Chapel, Northamptonshire (1949)

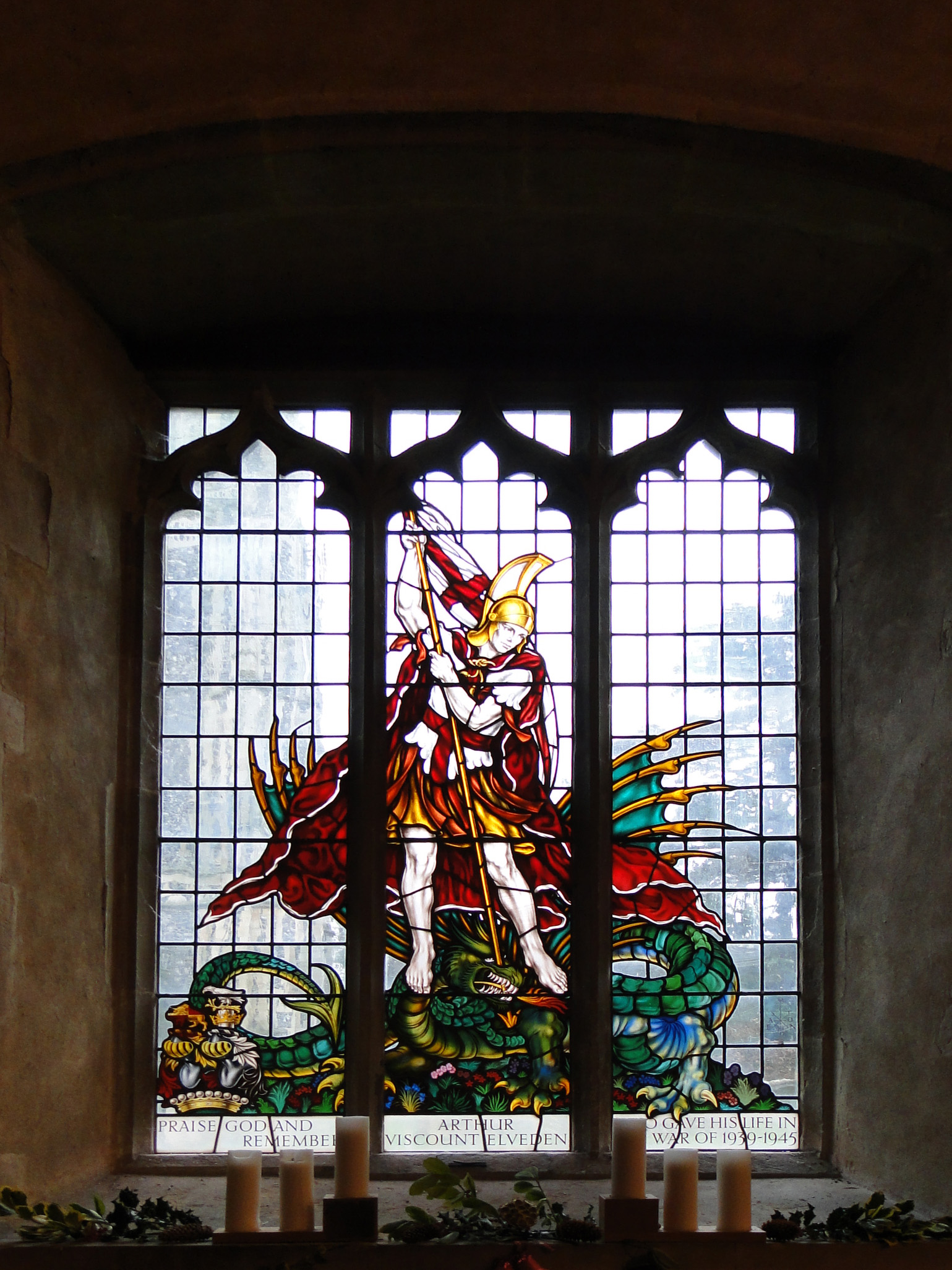
Church of St Andrew and St Patrick, Elveden, Suffolk (1950)

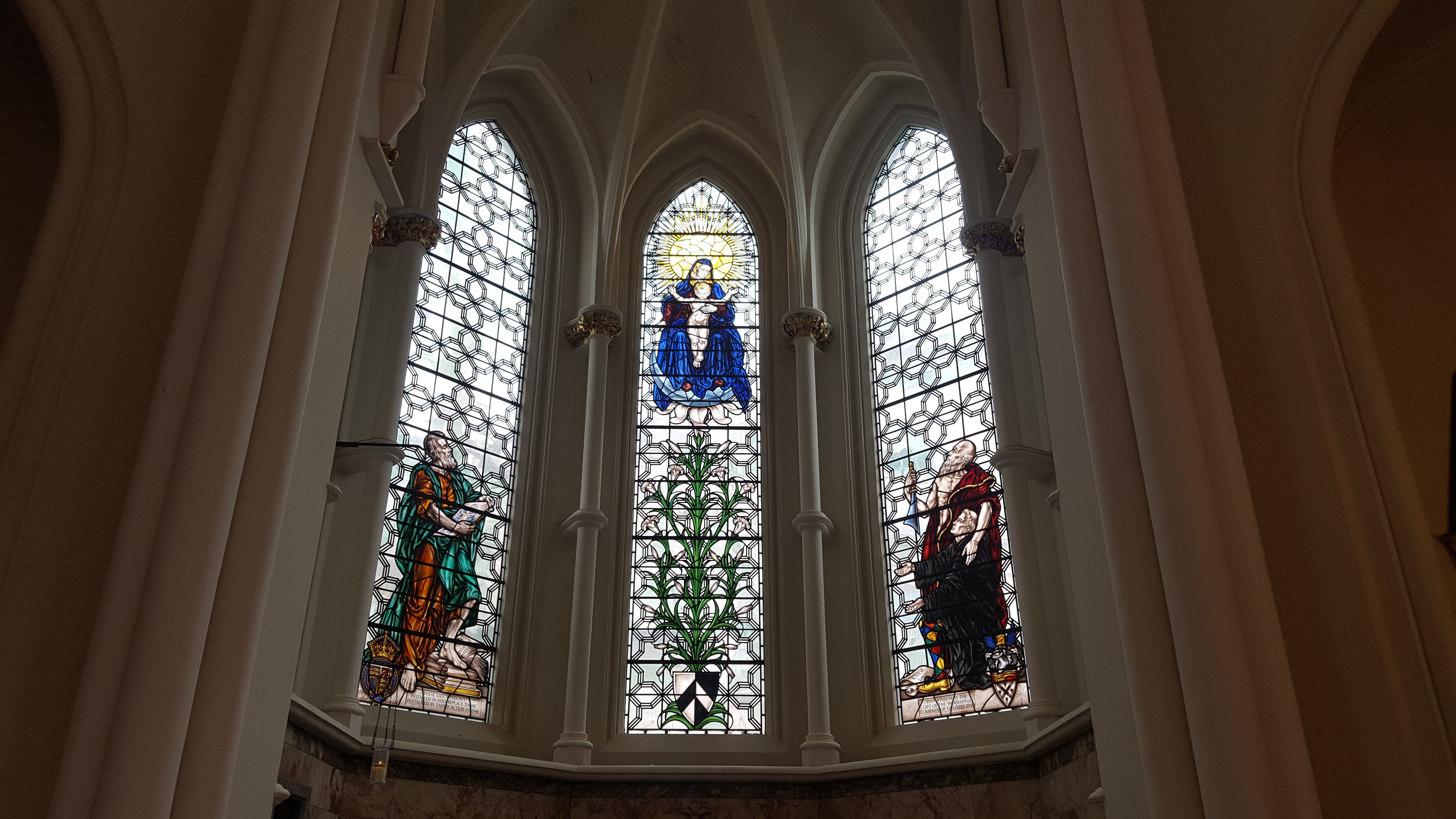
Church of St Bartholomew the less, City of London (1950)

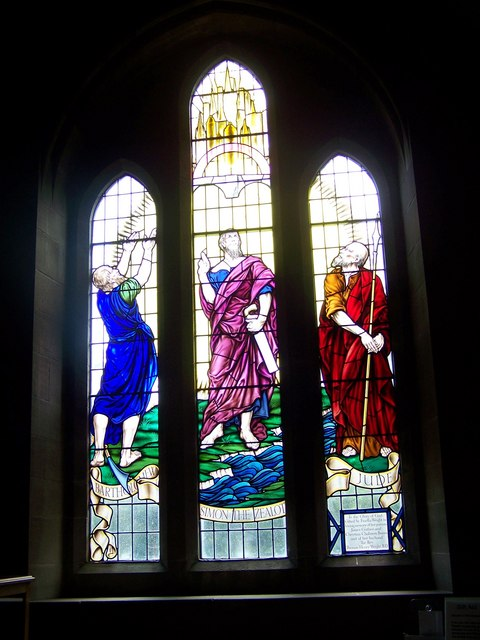
Brechin Cathedral, Angus (1952)

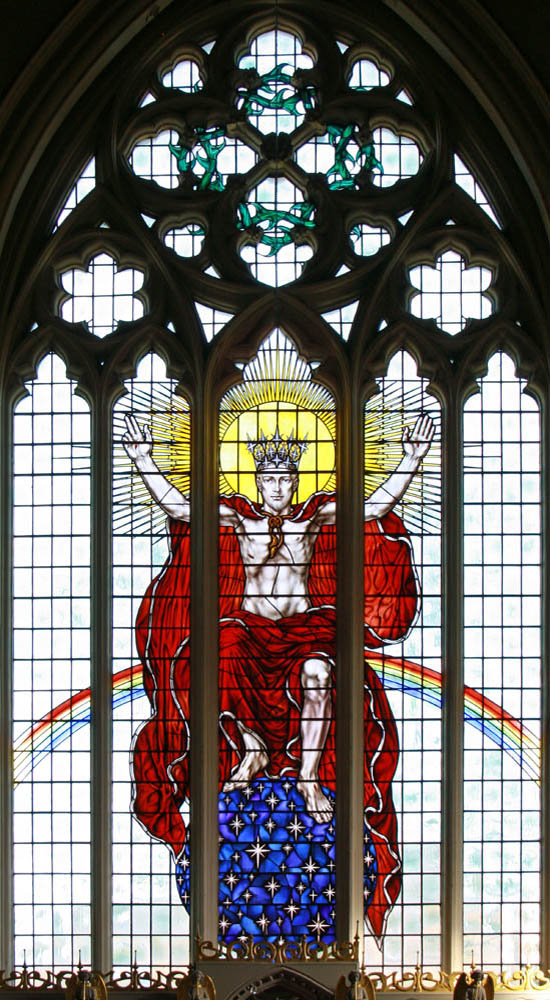
Church of Christ the Saviour, Ealing Broadway, London (1952)

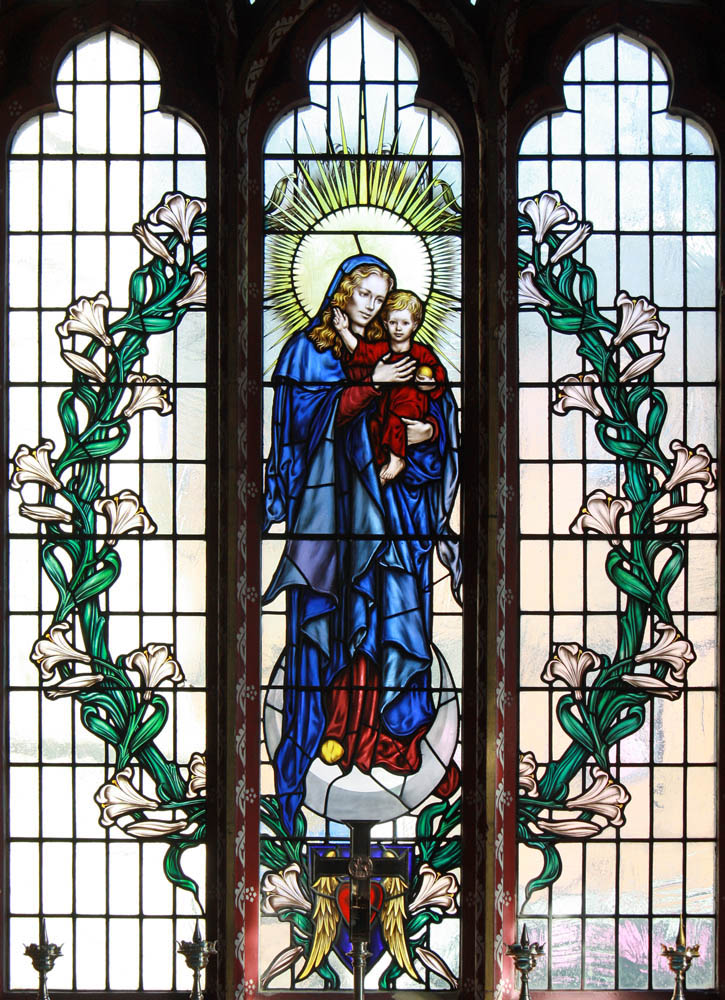
Church of Christ the Saviour, Ealing Broadway, London (1952)

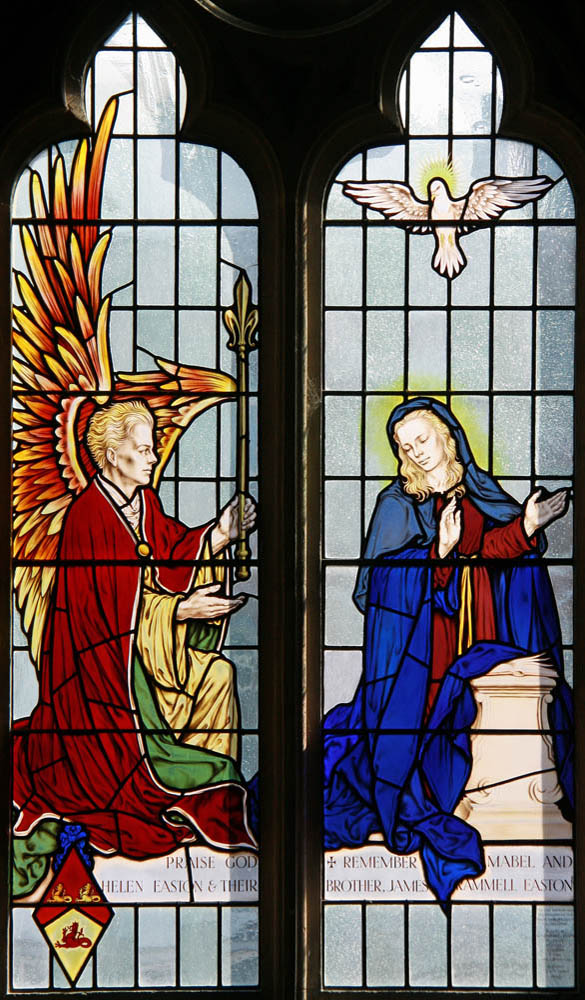
Church of Christ the Saviour, Ealing Broadway, London (1952)

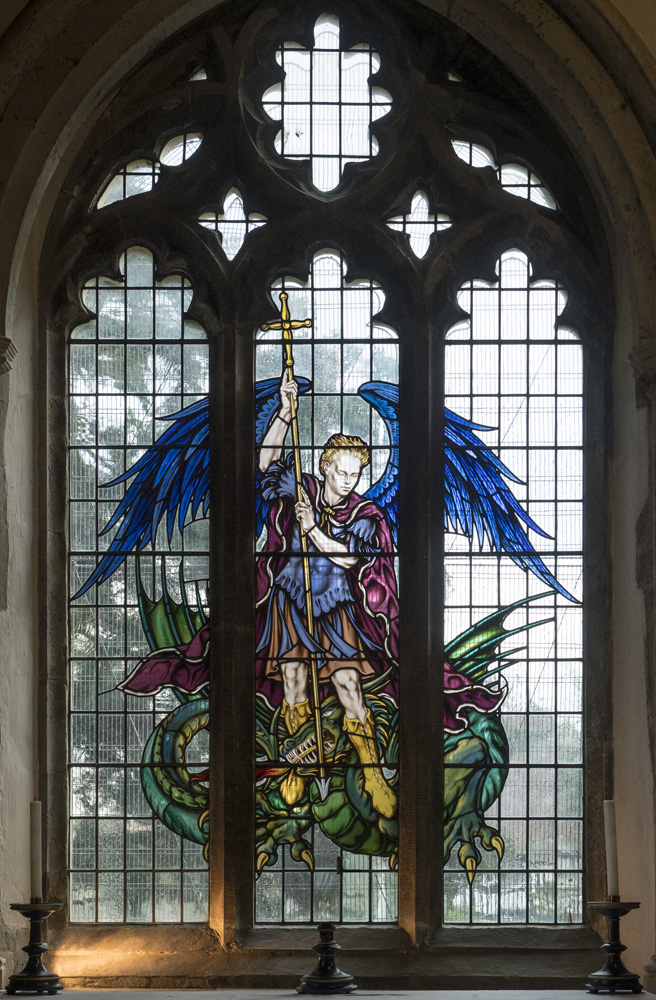
St Mary's Church, Eastbourne, Sussex (1953)

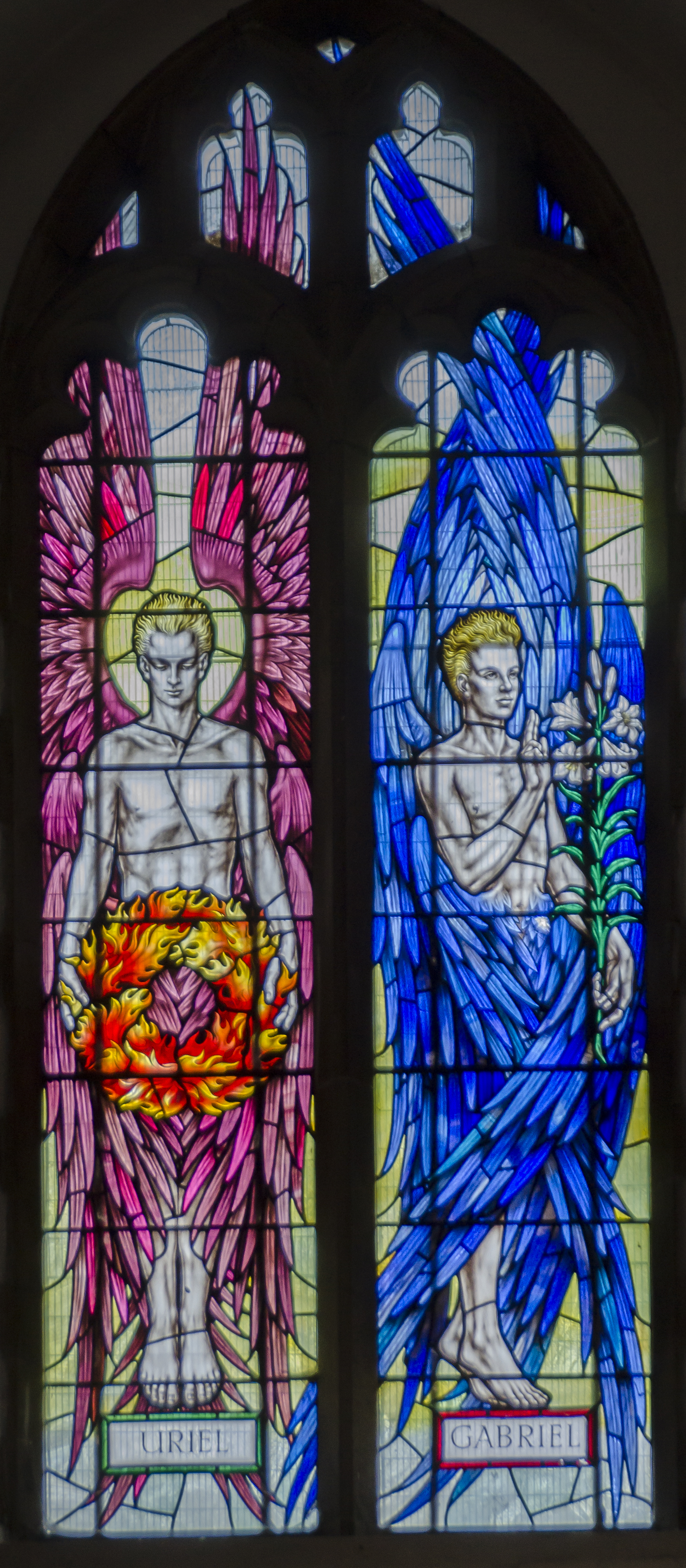
Grimsby Minster, Lincolnshire (1954)

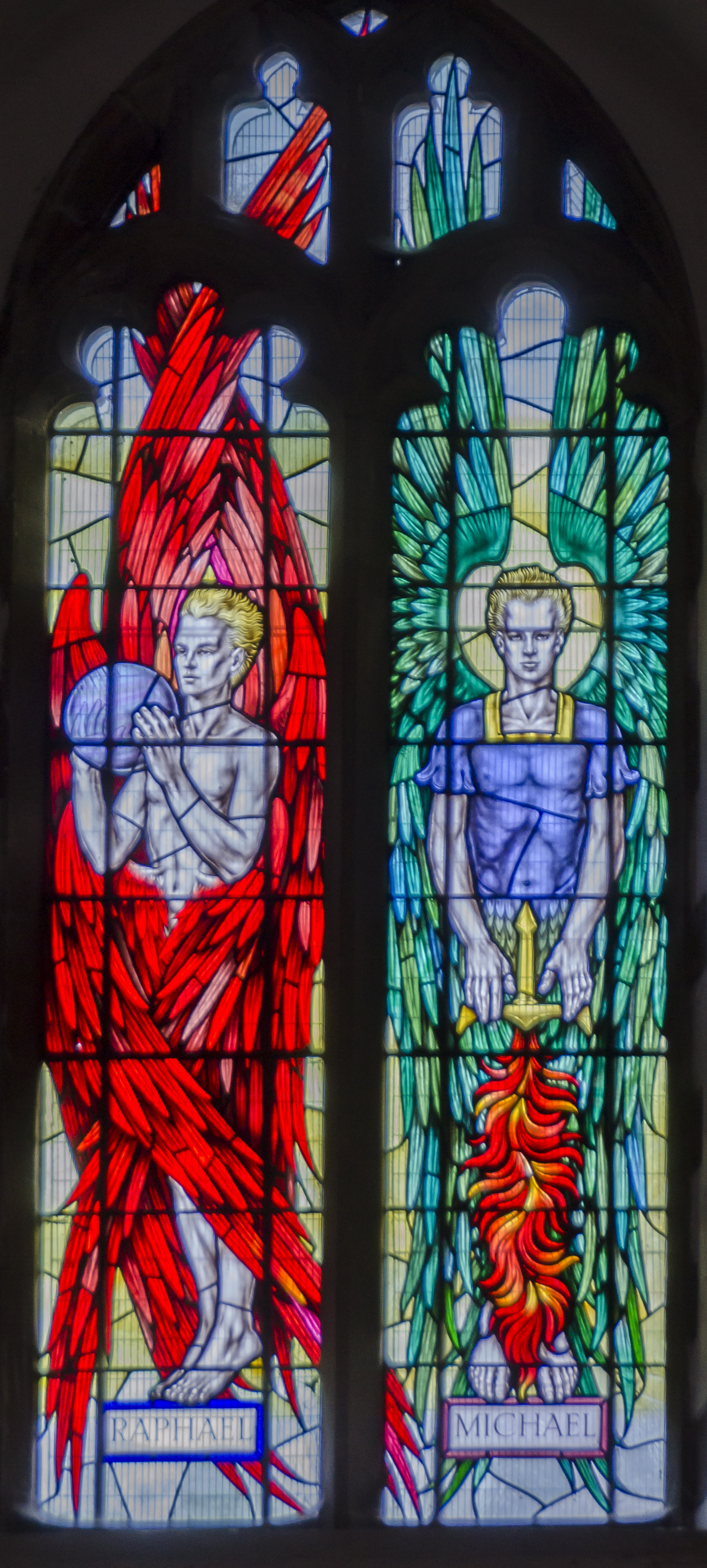
Grimsby Minster, Lincolnshire (1954)

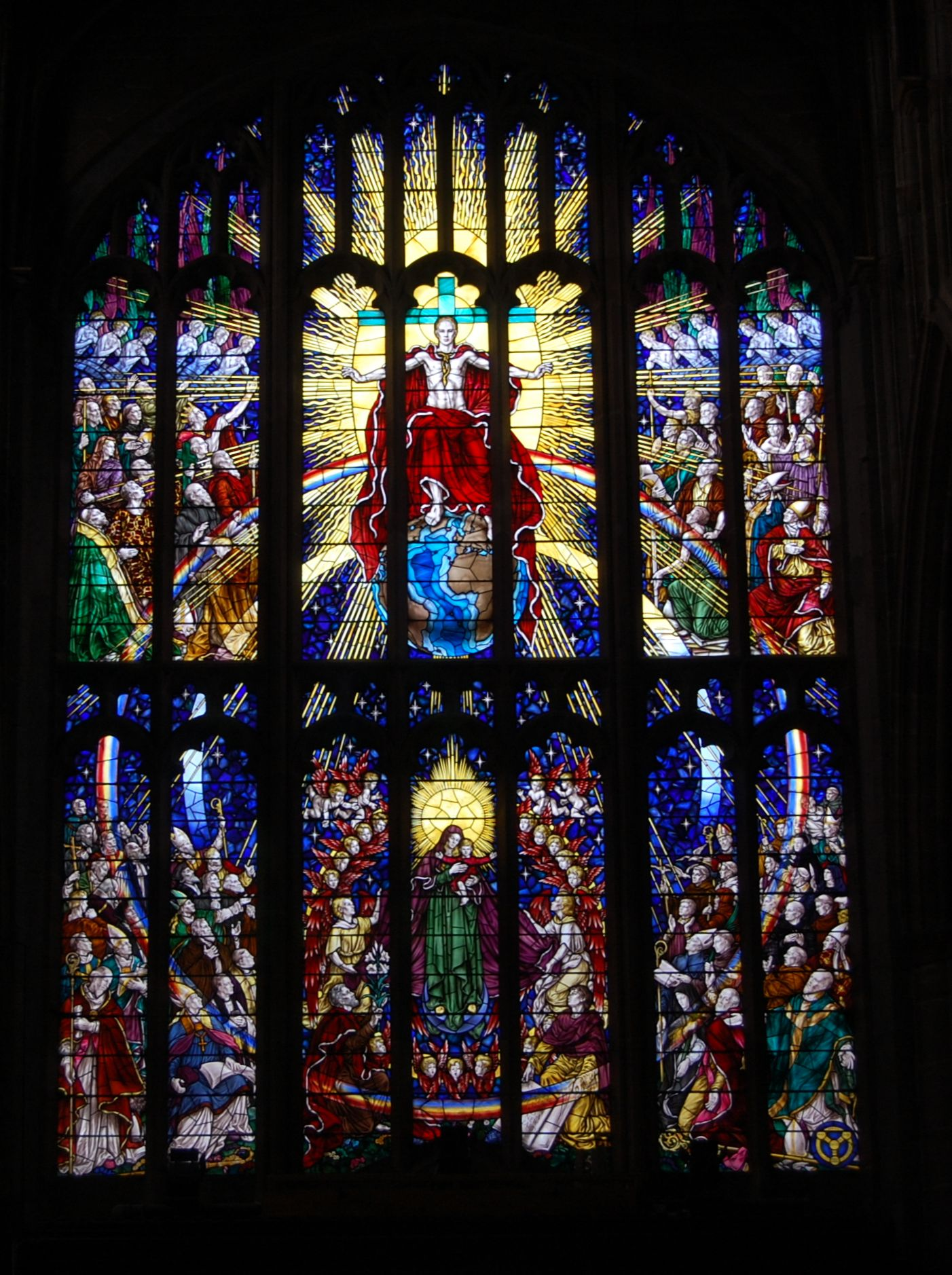
Holy Trinity Church, Coventry, West Midlands (1955)

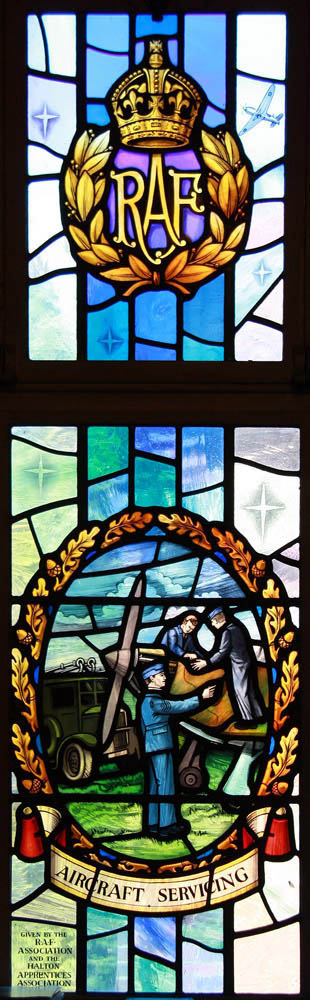
St George's Chapel, Biggin Hill, London (1955)

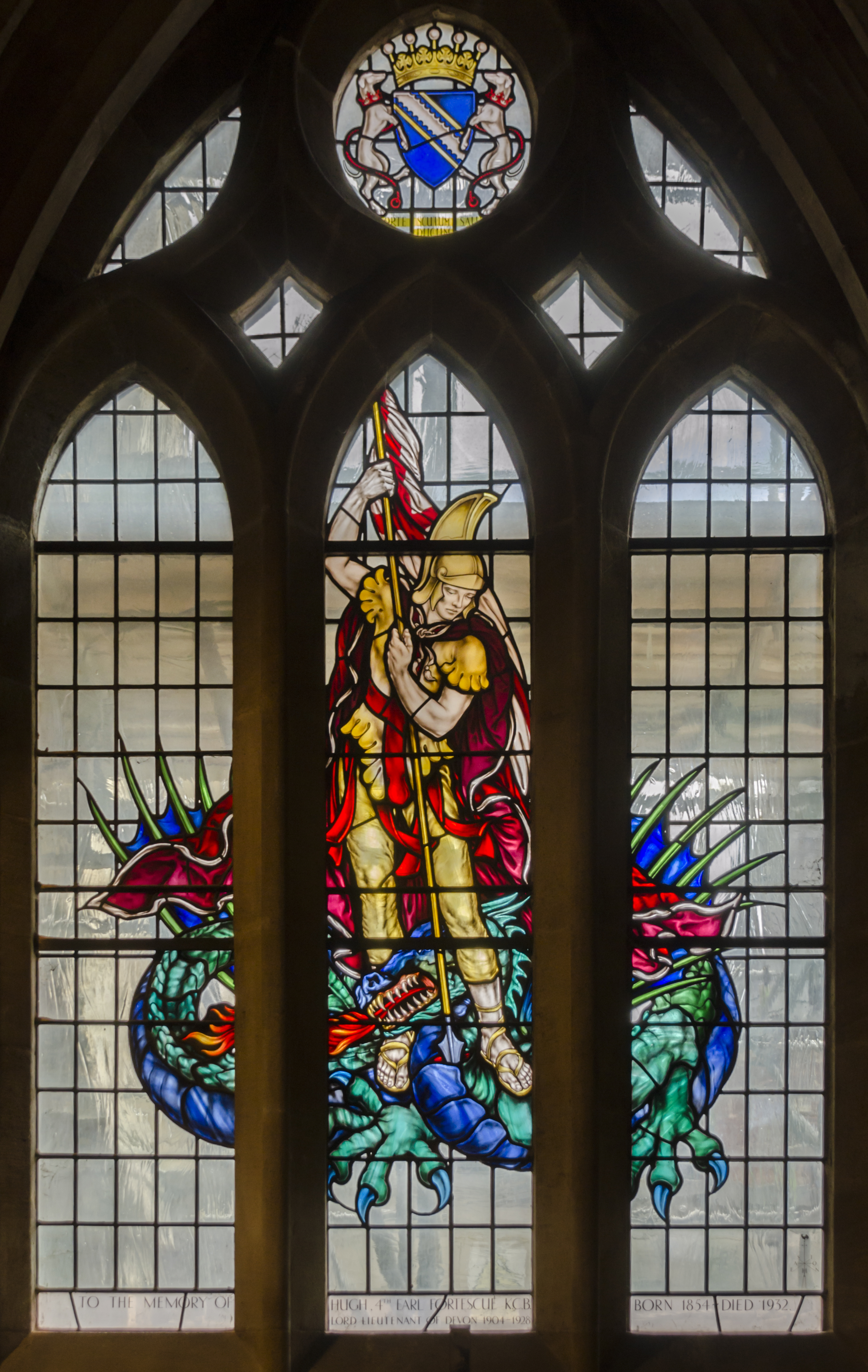
Exeter Cathedral, Devon (1956)

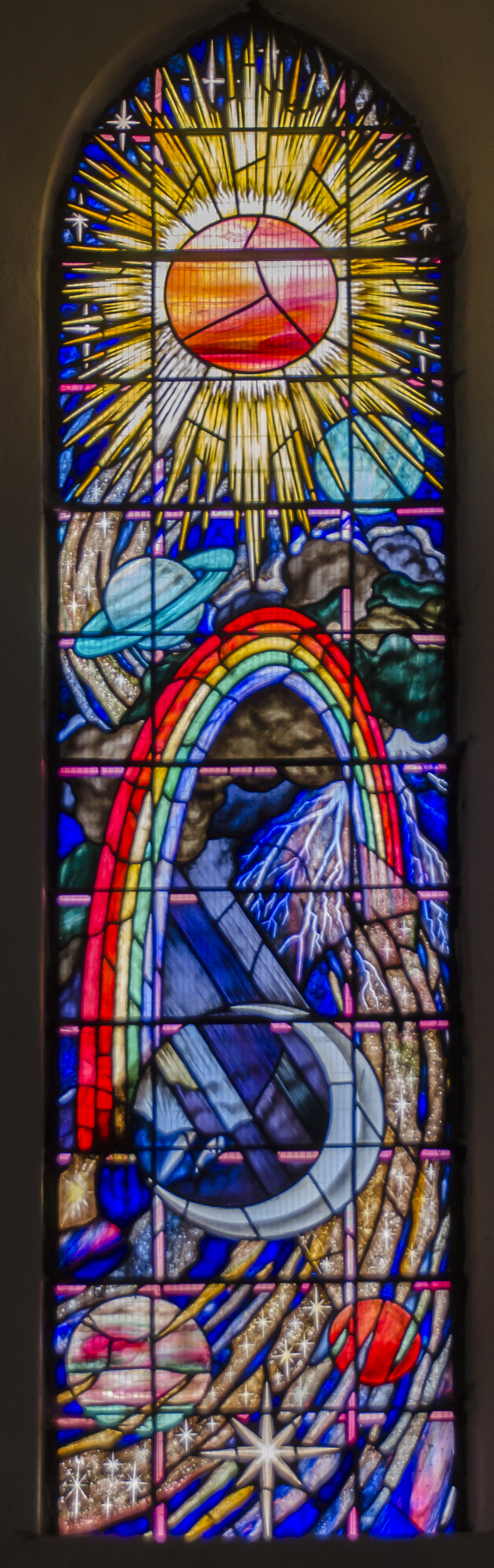
Grimsby Minster, Lincolnshire (1957)

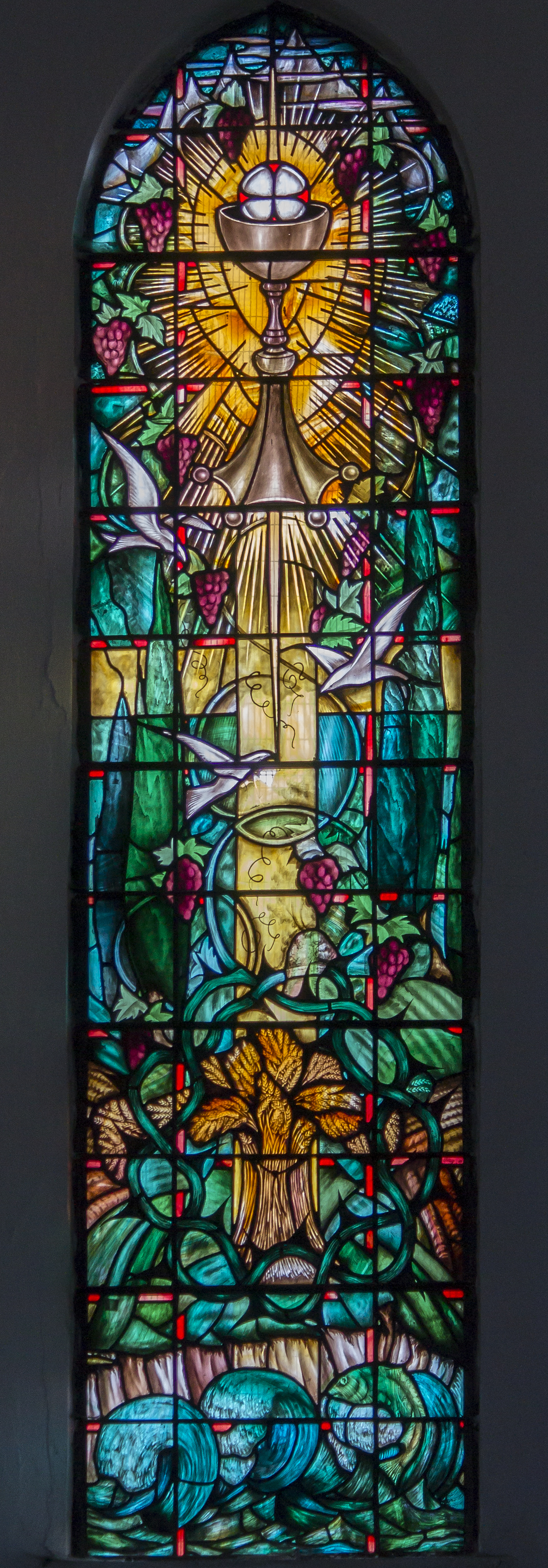
Grimsby Minster, Lincolnshire (1957)

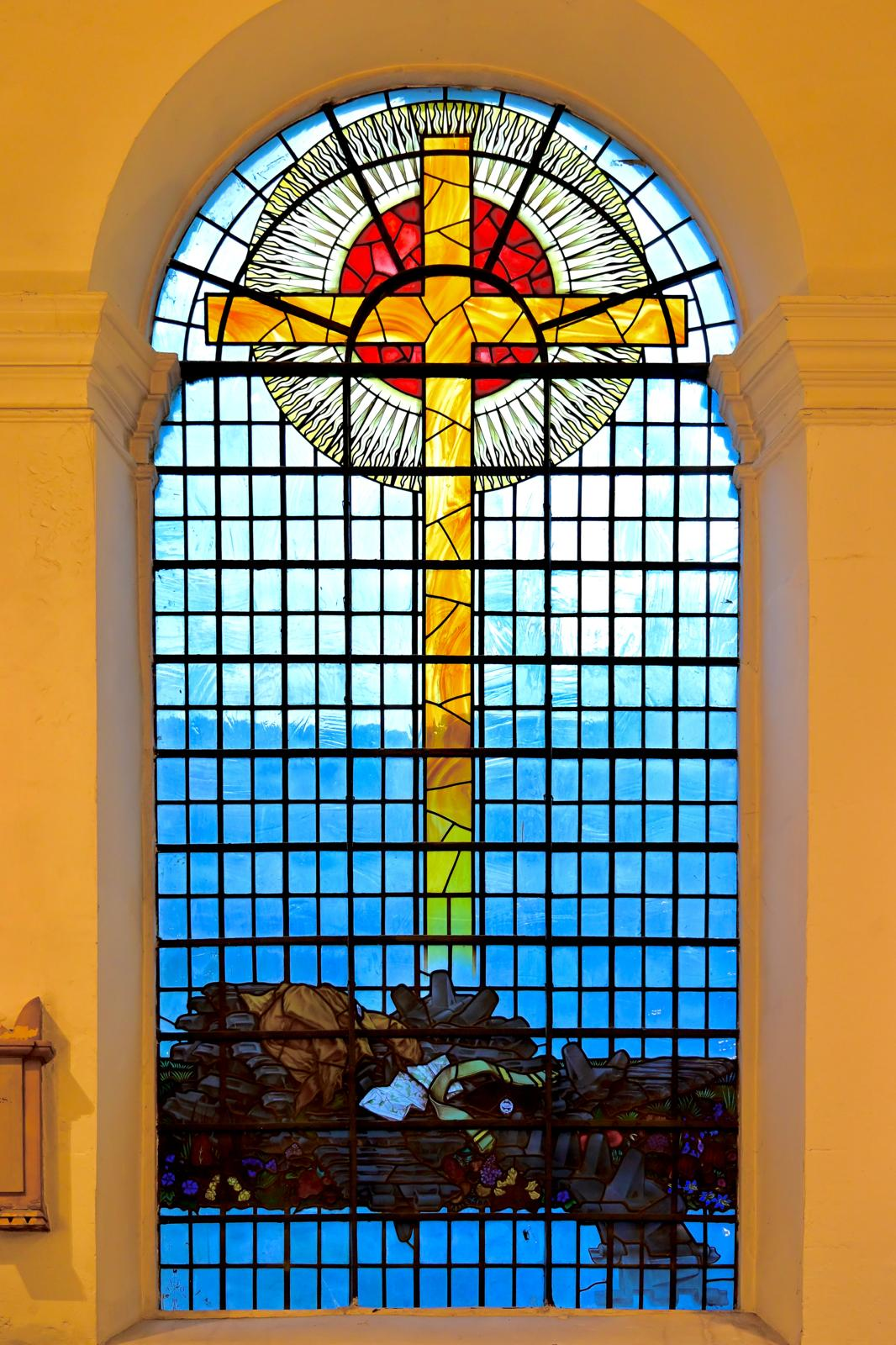
Church of St Peter-Upon-Cornhill, City of London (1960)

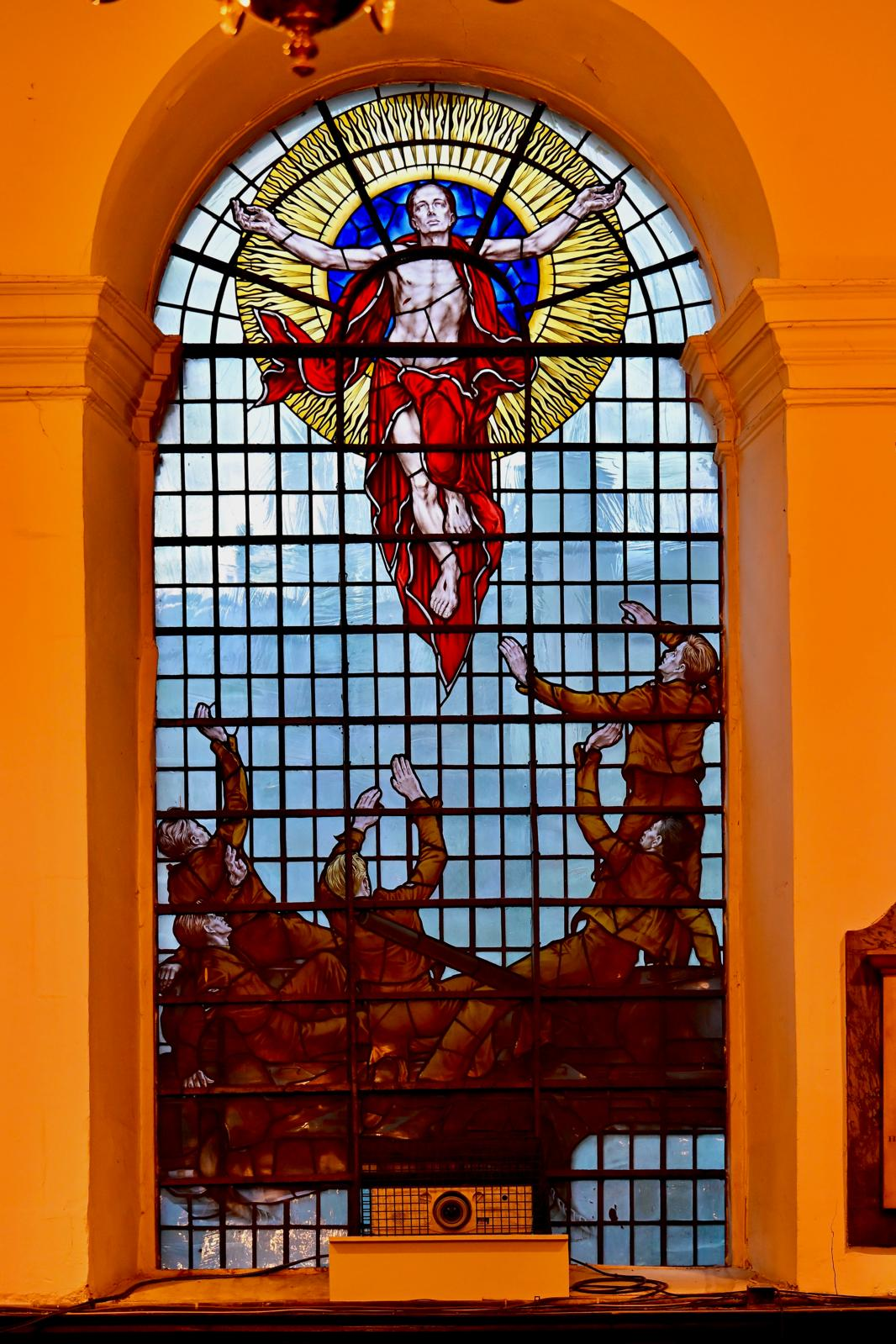
Church of St Peter-Upon-Cornhill, City of London (1960)
