= Ælflæda of Romsey =

Ælflæda is recorded in some sources as a daughter of King Edward the Elder and the founding Abbess of Romsey Abbey in 907, but historians of the period think that she did not exist.

According to Women in World History, Ælflæda (fl. 907–970), also known as Æðelflæd and Elflaeda, was the founding Abbess of Romsey Abbey and the daughter of Edward the Elder and Elflæd. Some popular histories of Romsey Abbey also state that it was founded by Edward the Elder under the leadership of Ælflæda around 907. She is sometimes recognized as a saint in the Catholic church.

In a discussion of the daughters of Edward the Elder, the historian Alan Thacker comments:

It is perhaps also worth noting that there is a shadowy record of a further sainted daughter of Edward the Elder, St Ælfled or Æthelflæd of Romsey. However, nothing is known of her and she may be no more than a duplicate of another almost equally shadowy saint of the same name, who was a later abbess of Romsey in Edgar's reign.

Sarah Foot observes that there is no medieval source for a foundation date of Romsey of 907, and she argues that the statement that a daughter of Edward the Elder was the first abbess of Romsey is an error resulting from a misreading of the year 967 in very small type as 907 in the Rolls Series edition of the works of Roger of Howden.
