= Æthelflæd of Romsey =

10th-century English Abbess

Ethelflaeda

Abbess of Romsey
- Born: c. 963
- Died: c. 1016
- Resting place: Romsey Abbey
- Honored in: Catholic Church
- Canonized: Pre-congregation
- Major shrine: St Ethelflaeda’s Chapel
- Feast: 23 October
- Patronage: Abbey Church of St Mary and St Ethelflaeda
- Other names: Aethelflaeda, Ethelfleda, Ælflæd, Æthelflæda
- Predecessor: St. Mærwynn
- Parents: Edgar, King of England or Æthelwold (father); Ælfthryth or Brithwina (mother)

Saint Æthelflæd of Romsey (also Ælflæd and Æthelflæda) was a late tenth-century abbess of Romsey Abbey. She is recognized as the patron saint of the Abbey Church of St Mary and St Ethelflaeda (fmr. Romsey Abbey) in Romsey, England.

== Life ==
Her identity is obscure, though in later stories she was said to be the daughter of a tenth-century nobleman Æthelwold or King Edgar of England. Æthelflæd's mother is recorded as either being Æthelwold's first wife Brithwina or his second wife Ælfthryth.

Æthelflæd became abbess of Romsey Abbey in c. 1003 after St. Mærwynn and Elwina according to Reverend H.G.D. Liveing's “Records of Romsey Abbey.” She was known for "chanting psalms whilst standing naked in the River Test at night." She is credited with several miracles as a youth: seeing her teacher outside gathering switches through the abbey wall, and light coming from her fingers once her lamp went out that allowed her to finish reading her lesson.

Her feast day is 23 October.

Æthelflæd appears in a small number of eleventh- and twelfth-century monastic calendars.

== Legacy ==
St Ethelflaeda's tomb is in the Abbey Church's St. Ethelflaeda Chapel. The "abbess’s crozier... [is] down the side of the tombstone." The chapel also contains a late 15th century "painted panel of a kneeling priest," a statue of St Benedict, and a "list of vicars of Romsey."

The Ethelflaeda festival is held at Abbey Church in her honor. A controversial diptych of her life created in 2016 by Christopher Gollon was added to the Abbey Church in 2018.

== See also ==
- Collier, Christopher (1990). "Romsey Minster in Saxon Times" (PDF). Proceedings of the Hampshire Field Club and Archaeological Society. 39: 41–52.
- Hollis, Stephanie (2013). The Literary Culture of the Anglo‑Saxon Royal Nunneries: Romsey and London, British Library, MS Lansdowne 436. Brepols.
