= Mærwynn =

Catholic and Eastern Orthodox saint

Saint Mærwynn

Abbess of Romsey
- Died: 10th century
- Venerated in: Catholic Church; Eastern Orthodox Church
- Canonized: Pre-congregation
- Feast: 10 February; 23 October: (secondary only, Catholic) commemoration of translation of her relics

Mærwynn (fl. 967−975 AD), also known as St. Merewenna or Merwinna, was a 10th-century abbess of Romsey Abbey. She is recognised as a saint in the Catholic and Eastern Orthodox churches.

== Life ==
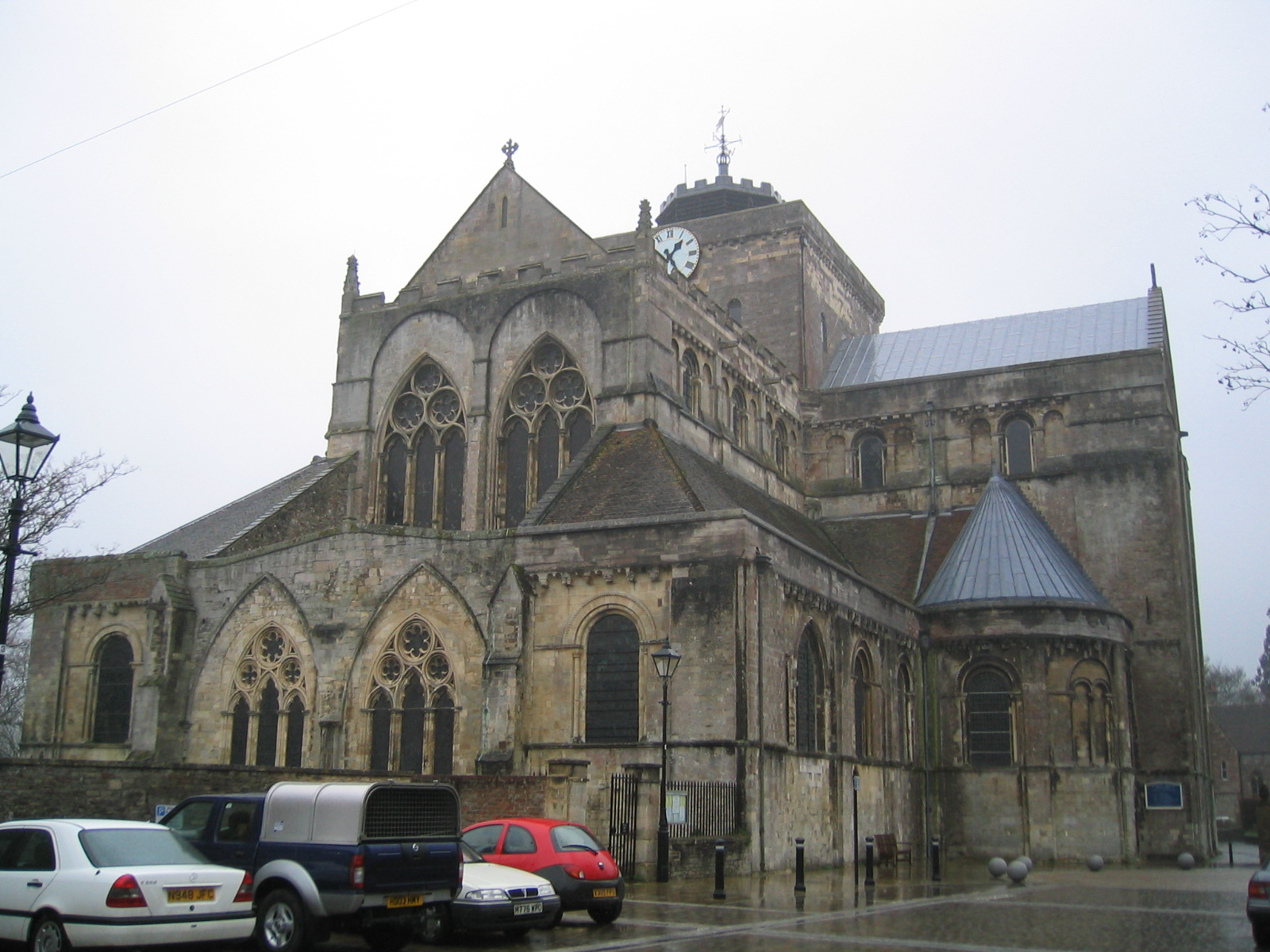
Romsey Abbey

Mærwynn was the founding abbess of the reconsecrated Abbey of Romsey, and there is some certainty that she was appointed to the position by King Edgar the Peaceable on Christmas in 974. While medieval legend had it that she was born in Ireland and educated by St. Patrick, historical understanding that five centuries separate them discounts this.

She is instead known more historically from several surviving documents: a king's charter, by Edgar the Peaceable, to Romsey Abbey; the medieval confraternity book of Winchester, known as the Liber Vitae of the New Minster; and the Secgan manuscript's hagiography.

King Edgar sent Æthelflæd, his daughter or step-daughter, to Mærwynn for care, and she became like a foster mother to the princess.

== Veneration ==
Mærwynn was buried at Romsey Abbey, close by to where her protégé Æthelflæd was buried. Her primary feast day is 10 February in both the Catholic and Eastern Orthodox churches. There are secondary commemorations in the Catholic Church marking the date of the translation of her relics (and of Æthelflæd's) on 29 October, with certain other secondary days of note mentioned by the Monks of Ramsgate.

== Romsey Abbey ==
The foundations of Mærwynn's abbey have been located under the tower, choir stalls and part of the nave of the current Norman church. Mærwynn's abbey was the second of the four church buildings to be built on the site; it was destroyed by Vikings in 1003 AD.
