= Gerald Coles =

English painter

Gerald Anthony Coles (1929–2004) was an English painter, printmaker, and stained glass designer.

Born in Luton, Bedfordshire, he was trained at the Luton School of Art (1943–45) before working for the Harper and Hendra Studios in Harpenden and then for Hugh Ray Easton (1945–47). He attended the Slade School of Fine Art in London (1951–54) during which time he won the Steer Painting Prize (1953).

From 1954 to 1958, he studied at the Ecole des Beaux Arts in Paris and travelled widely throughout Europe.

In 1959, he was awarded a French Government Travelling Scholarship to study stained glass design in France, and was awarded the Seguret Scholarship by the Cite Universitaire de Paris.

In 1960-61, he was awarded the Sir Arthur Evans Travelling Scholarship by the Worshipful Company of Glaziers and Painters of Glass to travel and study in Germany and Austria.

In 1975, he was elected Associate of the British Society of Master Glass Painters and in 1979 he was awarded a prize in The Steering Committee of Stained Glass Design, Tokyo.

During his career, Coles assisted Hugh Easton on many stained glass commissions, including the Battle of Britain memorial window in Westminster Abbey. Other commissions took him overseas to the United States, South Africa, India and Australia.

In addition to his skills as a stained glass designer, Coles produced numerous oil paintings, prints in the form of woodcuts and monotypes, watercolours and drawings.

He has exhibited at many places, including the Roland, Browse and Delbanco Gallery, the O’Hana Gallery, and, earlier, at the Maison Internationale, the Cité Université de Paris.

A number of his works are retained by the British Museum.
