= Romsey Abbey =

Anglican church in Hampshire, England

- Abbey Church of St Mary and St Ethelflaeda
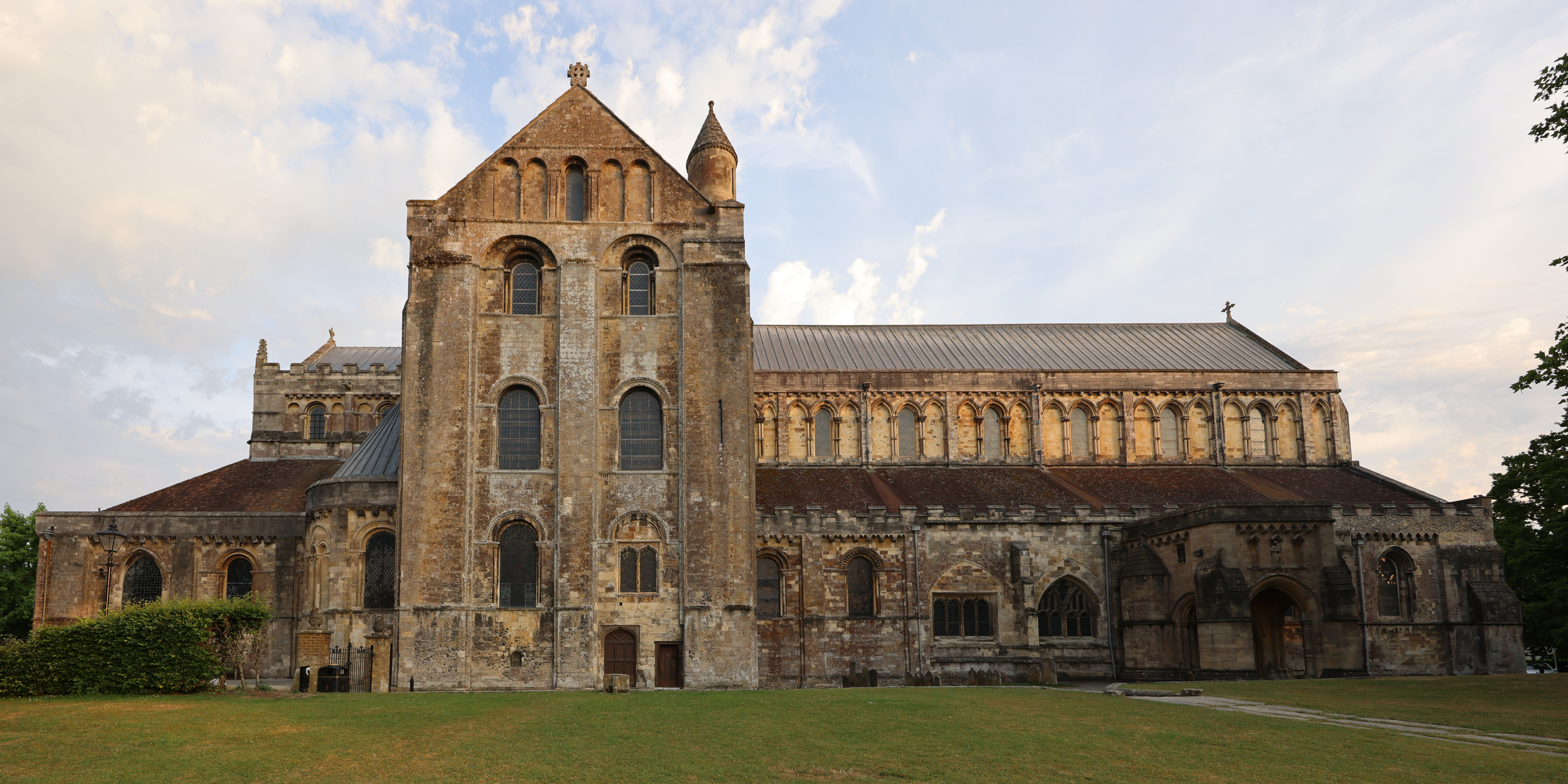
- Romsey Abbey

- Location within Hampshire
- 50°59′23″N 1°30′5″W
- OS grid reference: SU 35093 21257
- Location: Church Road, Romsey, Hampshire
- Country: England
- Denomination: Church of England
- Previous denomination: Roman Catholic
- Churchmanship: Broad Church
- Website: romseyabbey.org.uk

History
- Founded: 907
- Dedication: Virgin Mary; St Ethelflaeda of Romsey

Architecture
- Functional status: Parish church
- Heritage designation: Grade I listed
- Style: Norman

Administration
- Province: Canterbury
- Diocese: Winchester
- Parish: Romsey

Clergy
- Vicar: Thomas Wharton

Romsey Abbey is the name currently given to a parish church of the Church of England in Romsey, a market town in Hampshire, England. Until the Dissolution of the Monasteries it was the church of a Benedictine nunnery. The surviving Norman-era church is the town's outstanding feature and is now the largest parish church in the county of Hampshire since changes in county boundaries led to the larger Christchurch Priory being now included in Dorset. The current vicar is the Reverend Thomas Wharton, who took up the post in September 2018.

== Monastic history ==
The church was originally built during the 10th century, as part of a monastic foundation of Benedictine women. In 968, the abbey was gifted land by King Edgar and rededicated.

The religious community continued to grow and a village grew around it. Both suffered already in the 10th century, when Viking raiders sacked the village and burnt down the original church in 993. However, the abbey was rebuilt in stone in around 1000 and the village quickly recovered. The abbey and its community of nuns flourished and was renowned as a seat of learning – especially for the children of the nobility.

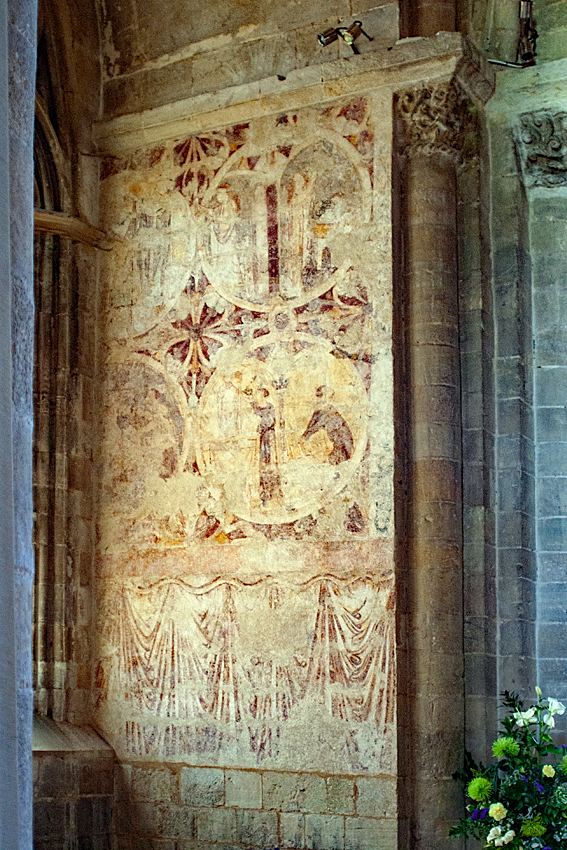
12th-century wall painting

In Norman times a substantial, new stone abbey was built on the old Anglo-Saxon foundation (c. 1130 to 1140) by Henry of Blois, bishop of Winchester and abbot of Glastonbury, younger brother of King Stephen. The construction of this church took much of the 12th century, and it still substantially survives today. In this general period, the community prospered and by 1240 the nuns numbered more than 100.

It was in this period that the dramatic case arose of Romsey's Abbess Mary, who inherited the County of Boulogne in 1159. The following year, she was taken from the abbey and married to Matthew of Alsace. The marriage shocked their contemporaries and drew the ire of the Church.

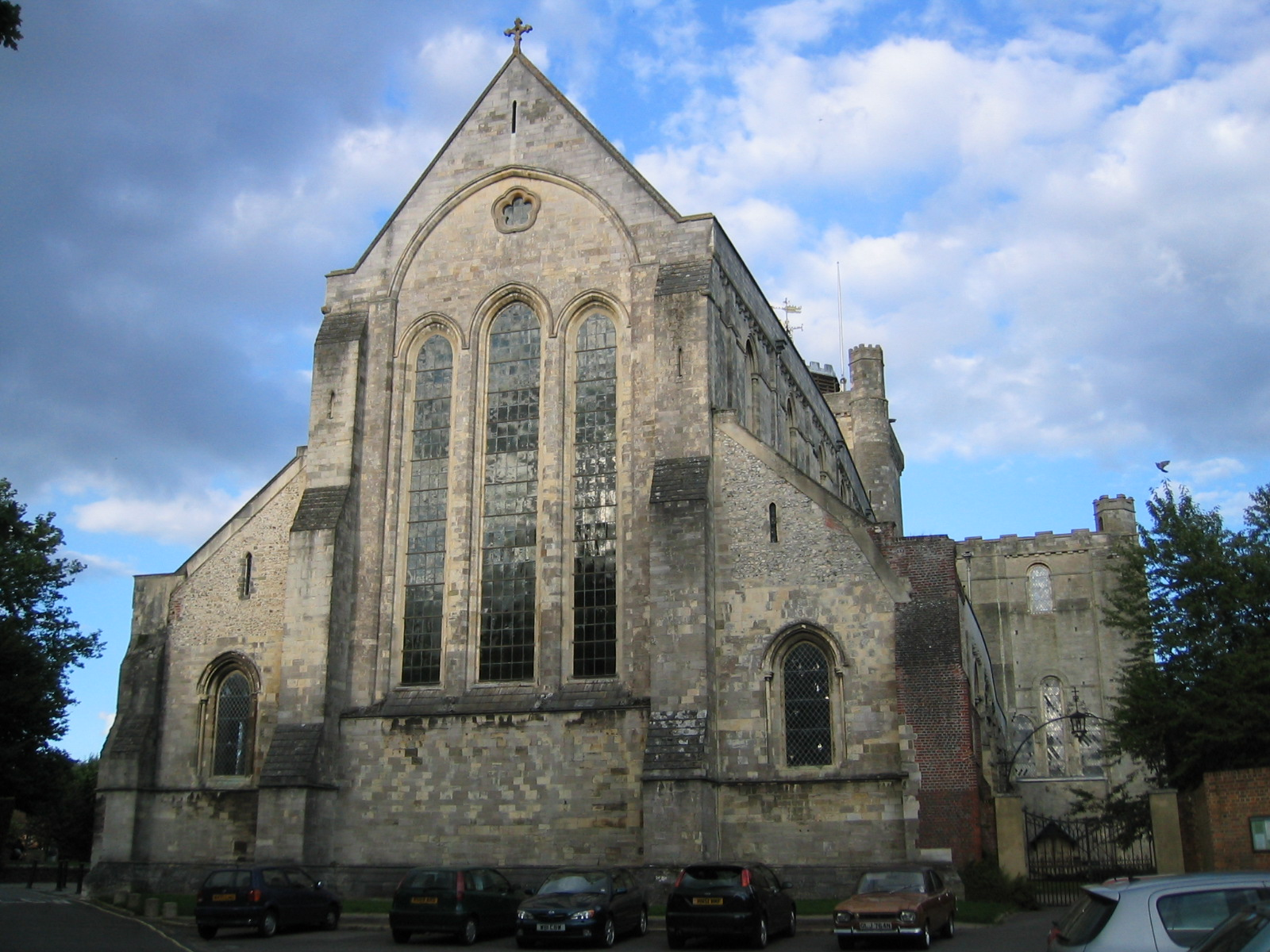
West front

The abbey continued to grow and prosper until the Black Death struck the town in 1348–9. While it is thought that as much as half of the population of the town – which was then about 1,000 – died as a result, the number of nuns fell by over 80% to 19. 72 nuns died including Abbess Johanna. After the plague there were never more than 26 nuns in the Abbey.

In the later Middle Ages, there are some records of irregularities in the conduct of the house. For instance, abbess Elizabeth Broke (1472–1502) was alleged to have ruled over a period of scandal, with nuns frequenting the town’s taverns, poor dress standards, irregular bookkeeping practices, and unhealthy relationships with the chaplains.

== Post-Reformation parish ==
Although the community of nuns itself was forcibly dispersed in the Dissolution of the Monasteries, the abbey buildings escaped the general fate of other religious and charitable establishments at this time and were not demolished. This was because the abbey church had a substantial section dedicated to St Lawrence which served as a place of worship for the townspeople. This arrangement, found also elsewhere in various forms, was designed to preserve the particular life of the nuns, with its heavy schedule of church services, from encroachment by the needs of the people. The latter were catered for, however, by celebrations of the liturgy ensured by the nuns' chaplains.

Subsequently, the town purchased the abbey buildings from the Crown for £100 in 1544. The operation presumably aimed, under the cloak of public service, at furthering private interests, since the town's magnates then soon set about demolishing that very section, set aside as the church of St Lawrence, that had ensured the survival of buildings in the first place. All over the country, the demolition of religious buildings brought for private enterprise a rich harvest of lead and building materials.

During the English Civil War the building suffered further material damage at the hands of Parliamentarian troops in 1643, including destruction of the organ.

What survives of the abbey buildings today, though limited to a remodelled and restored form of the former abbey church, is arguably due especially to the efforts of a 19th-century incumbent, the Reverend Edward Lyon Berthon. It now forms the largest Church of England parish church in the county of Hampshire.

== Notable burials ==
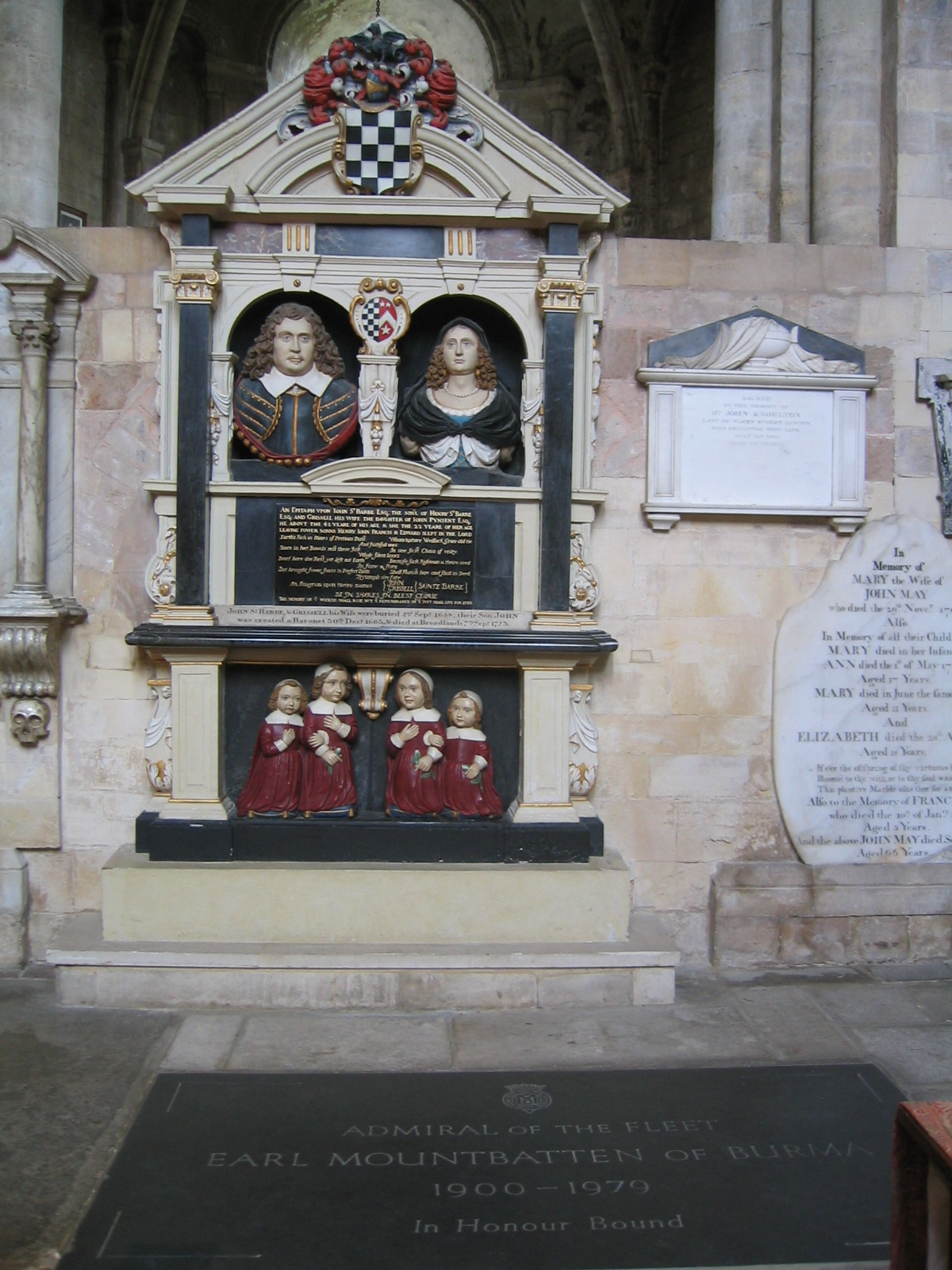
Tombs of John and Grissell St Barbe and that of Earl Mountbatten of Burma.

Among the tombs housed in the present church are:

Reportedly, that of Prince Edmund Atheling (c. 966 – c. 970), the eldest son of Edgar the Peaceful, King of Northumbria and Mercia, by his third wife, Ælfthryth, the elder brother of King Æthelred the Unready (c. 968–1016) who died in infancy and was buried in the old Romsey Abbey.

John and Grissell St Barbe, both died in 1658. The family acquired the abbey estate shortly after the dissolution and held it until 1723.

William Petty (1623–1687), in his day a noted English economist, scientist, philosopher, Fellow of the Royal Society and politician. He first came to prominence serving Oliver Cromwell and the Commonwealth in Ireland and, like many others, later served under King Charles II and King James II. Knighted in 1661, he became the great-grandfather of Prime Minister William Petty Fitzmaurice, 2nd Earl of Shelburne and 1st Marquess of Lansdowne.

John Latham (1740–1837), English physician, naturalist and ornithologist, one of the first to examine scientifically birds discovered in Australia. He was elected to the Royal Society in 1775, took part in the creation of the Linnean Society, and in 1812, he was elected a foreign member of the Royal Swedish Academy of Sciences.

The Earl Mountbatten of Burma (1900–1979). On being given his Earldom in 1947, Mountbatten had been granted the lesser title of Baron Romsey and he lived locally at Broadlands House. On 27 August 1979, Mountbatten, his grandson Nicholas, and two others were assassinated by a bomb, set by members of the Provisional Irish Republican Army, hidden aboard his fishing boat in Mullaghmore, County Sligo, Ireland. He was buried here following a Ceremonial Funeral in Westminster Abbey. By request, his grave is aligned north–south, rather than the conventional east–west, so that he faces the sea where his wife, Edwina's, ashes were scattered.

Buried in the churchyard is Major General Sir Richard Harman Luce (1867–1952), an English surgeon, British Army officer and politician, who served for a time as MP for Derby in 1924 and later as Mayor of Romsey.

=== Titanic connection ===
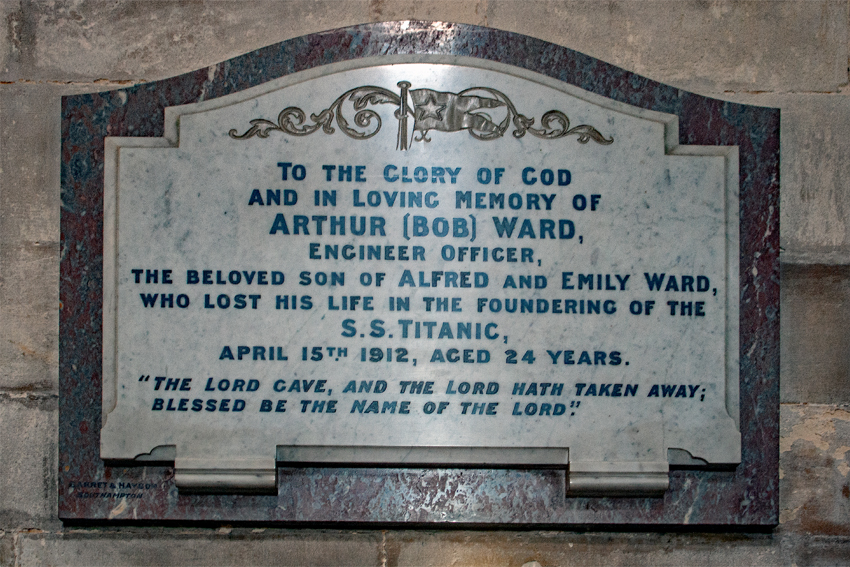
Titanic memorial to Arthur Ward

One of the Titanic's engineering officers, Arthur (Bob) Ward, who died in the sinking, is commemorated in the Abbey with a plaque in one of the chapels.

== St Swithun's, Crampmoor ==
The village of Crampmoor, to the east of Romsey, is within the ecclesiastical parish of Romsey. St Swithun's, Crampmoor, is Romsey Abbey's daughter church. It was built in the nineteenth century to serve a rural community as both a church and a school. There were originally two other such combined use buildings in the parish; the school moved out from St Swithun's in 1927.

== Bells ==
The church's bells were once housed in a detached campanile. After its demolition in 1625, the set of six bells was transferred to a wooden belfry on top of the central tower. They were replaced by a new set of eight in 1791; the heaviest, the tenor, weighing 26 cwt. Three of the bells were recast in 1932. The bells and their eighteenth-century bell frame were restored in 2007, when removing the crown reduced the weight of the tenor to 22 cwt. The bells are now known across the region for being one of the finest rings of 8 bells.

== Music ==
=== Choir ===
Romsey Abbey has a choir of boy choristers (formed in the late 19th century) and a back row of adult altos, tenors and basses drawn from the local area. Owing to the original foundation of the Abbey, the traditional choir was of young women. Today there is a choir of girls, a senior girls choir, a training choir of youngsters and a consort of voluntary singers and members of the congregation who sing when the choirs are on holiday. Over the years the choirs have recorded multiple CDs, sung for royalty, enjoyed choir tours to numerous UK Cathedrals, Belgium, Italy and France and have a twinning relationship with a German choir from Mülheim an der Ruhr. They have appeared numerous times on BBC Songs of Praise as well as featuring in a BBC documentary in 2018. The current director of music is Martin Seymour.

=== Organs ===
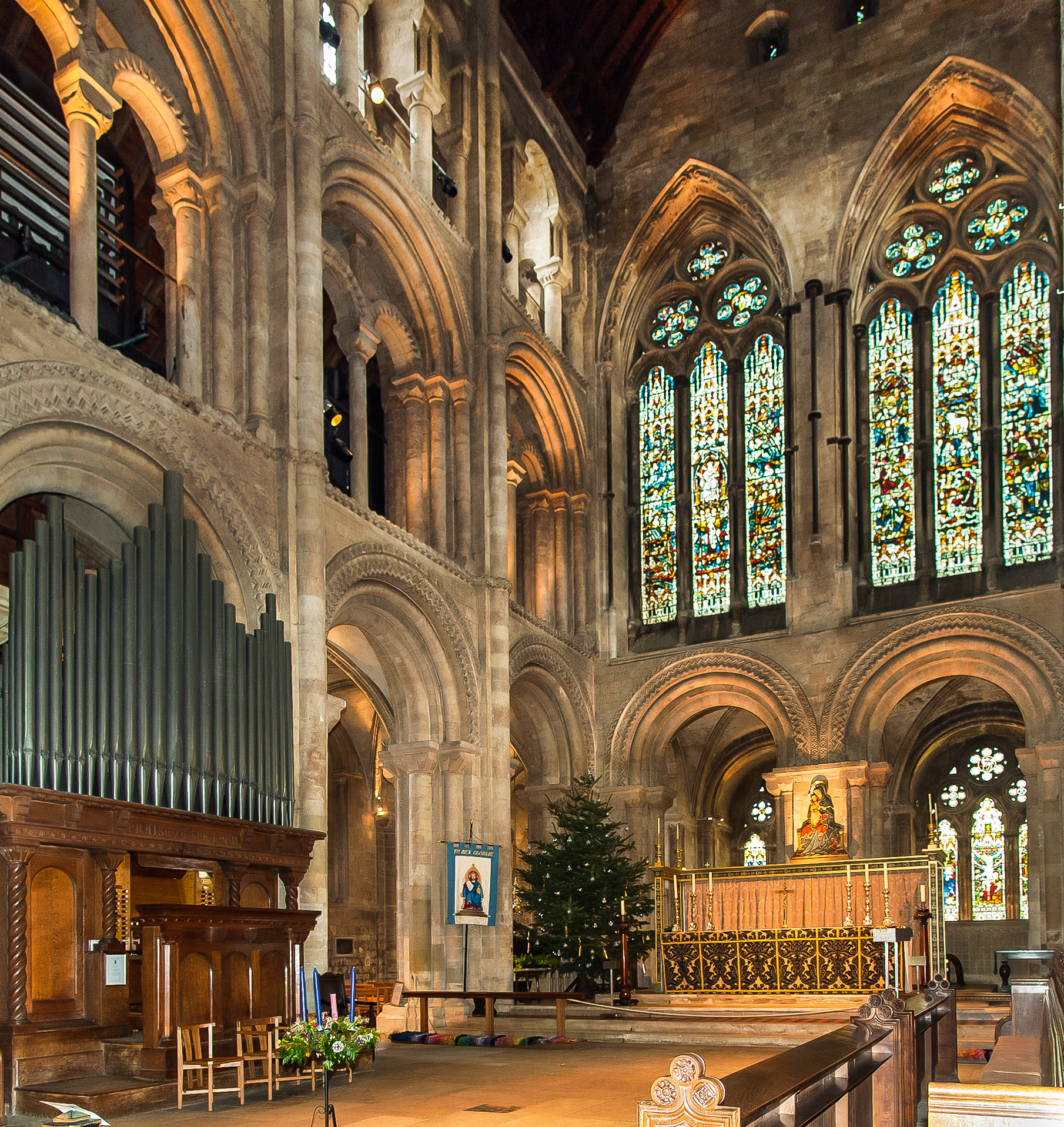
The Choir and organ of Romsey Abbey December 2012

Romsey Abbey has two organs. The main instrument was built by J W Walker & Sons in 1858 and replaced an earlier instrument by Henry Coster. The Walker Organ was rebuilt in its present position and enlarged in 1888. Major restoration work was carried out by J. W. Walker & Sons Ltd in 1995/96 under the supervision of the abbey's organist, Jeffrey Williams, restoring the mechanical actions and overhauling all of the pipe work. In 1999 a completely new nave organ by Walkers was constructed with its pipe work located on the south triforium. This can be played either from a mobile console in the nave or from the main console.

=== Organist and master of the choristers ===
- Miss Elizabeth Smith (becomes Mrs Messum in 1835) ???? - 1835
- S.T. Cromwell 1836 – 1849
- Francis Wellman
- ??? Beazley
- W. Mason 1864 – 1865 (afterwards organist of Trinity Church, South Shields)
- E.W. Perren 1866 – 1867 (afterwards organist of St Thomas Church, Winchester)
- W. Channon Cornwall 1867 – 1876
- Robert S. Airey 1887–1888 (formerly organist of St John's Church, Penzance)
- William Cary Bliss 1888 – 1899
- J. C. Richards ca. 1907
- R. T. Bevan ca. 1921
- Charles Tryhorn 1926–1957
- Charles Piper 1957–1980
- Anthony Burns-Cox 1980–1990
- Jeffrey Williams 1990–2004
- Robert Fielding 2004–2015
- George Richford 2015–2019 (afterwards Professor of Music, Royal Marines and Director of Music at Portsmouth Cathedral)
- Canon Peter Gould 2019–2019 (Interim Director of Music)
- Martin Seymour 2019 - (Director of Music)

== List of abbesses ==
Name	year appointed	year resigned/died	Notes
Ælflæda	907		Daughter of King Edward the Elder, the abbey was built for her.
Merwinna	966		
Elwina	992		
Æthelflæda	1003		
Wulfynn	1016		
Ælfgyfu	1042		
Cristina		1093	Daughter of Edward the Exile
Incomplete records for about a century			
Hadewisa	1130		
Matilda	1150	1155	
Mary	1155	1171	Daughter of King Stephen, taken from the abbey and married.
Juliana	1171	1174	
Matilda Patric	1218	1219	
Matilda	1218	1230	
Matilasa de Barbfle	1230	1231	
Isabel de Nevil	1237		
Cecilia	1238	1247	
Constancia	1247	1261	
Amicia de Sulhere	1261	1268	
Alicia Walerand	1269		
Phillipa de Stokes	1296	1307	was very infirm as abbess.
Clementcia de Guildford	1307	1314	Was very infirm as abbess.
Alicia de Wyntershulle	1314	1315	whose murder was never solved.
Sybil Carbonel	1315		
Johanna Icthe	1333		
Johanna Gerney	1349	1351	
Isabella de Camoys	1352		
Lucy Everard	1396		
Felicia Aas	1405	1417	
Matilda Lovell	1417	1462	
Johanna Brydduys	1462	1472	
Elizabeth Broke	1472	1502	Her tenure was tainted by scandal.
Joyce Rowse	1502	1515	
Ann Westbroke	1515	1523	
Elizabeth Ryprose	1523	1524	

== See also ==
- List of English abbeys, priories and friaries serving as parish churches
- List of monasteries dissolved by Henry VIII of England

== Sources ==
- Keene, Derek (1985). Survey of Medieval Winchester, Part 2. Oxford University Press.
- Venarde, Bruce L. (1999). Society: Nunneries in France and England, 890-1215. Cornell University Press.
