= List of Anglo-Saxon saints =

The following list contains saints from Anglo-Saxon England during the period of Christianization until the Norman Conquest of England (c. AD 600 to 1066). It also includes British saints of the Roman and post-Roman period (3rd to 6th centuries), and other post-biblical saints who, while not themselves English, were strongly associated with particular religious houses in Anglo-Saxon England, for example, their relics reputedly resting with such houses.

The only list of saints which has survived from the Anglo-Saxon period itself is the so-called Secgan, an 11th-century compilation enumerating 89 saints and their resting-places.

== Table ==
Name	Century of death	Origin	Chief medieval resting place	Notes
Acca of Hexham	8th	Northumbrian	Ripon / Durham / Peterborough	Relics translated to Durham 1032; Peterborough Abbey possessed relic in the 12th century
Æbbe of Abingdon	7th	West Saxon	Oxford	Details uncertain
Æbbe "the Elder" of Coldingham	7th	Northumbrian	Coldingham	Translated to Durham in the 11th century
Æbbe "the Younger" of Coldingham	9th	Northumbrian	Coldingham	May be a doppelganger of Æbbe the Elder
Æbbe of Thanet	8th	Kentish	Minster-in-Thanet	Also called Eormenburh, of which "Æbbe" may be a hypocoristic form
Ælfgar of Selwood	unknown	West Saxon	Selwood forest	Known only from 16th century source
Ælfgifu of Exeter	unknown	West Saxon	unknown	May be Ælfgifu of Shaftesbury
Ælfgifu of Shaftesbury	10th	West Saxon	Shaftesbury	May be Ælfgifu of Exter
Ælfheah of Canterbury	11th	West Saxon	Canterbury St Augustine's	His body lay in London Cathedral from 1012 to 1023, but was translated to Canterbury with the cooperation of Cnut
Ælfheah of Winchester	10th	West Saxon	Winchester Old Minster	
Ælfflæd of Whitby	8th	Northumbrian	Whitby	
Ælfnoth of Stowe	7th	Mercian	Stowe forest	
Ælfthryth of Crowland	9th	Mercian	Crowland	
Ælfwald of Northumbria	8th	Northumbrian	Hexham	
Æthelberht of Bedford	unknown	Mercian	Bedford	May be the same as Æthelberht of East Anglia
Æthelberht of East Anglia	8th	East Anglian	Hereford	
Æthelberht of Kent	7th	Kentish	Ramsey	
Æthelburh of Barking	7th	East Saxon	Barking	
Æthelburh of Faremoutiers	7th	East Anglian	Faremoutiers	
Æthelburh of Hackness	8th	Northumbrian	Hackness	
Æthelburh of Kent	7th	Kentish	Lyminge	
Æthelflæd of Ramsey	10th	East Anglian	Ramsey	Wife of Æthelwine, Ealdorman of East Anglia
Æthelburh of Wilton	9th	West Saxon	Wilton	Allegedly foundress of Wilton Abbey and half-sister of Ecgberht, king of Wessex and Kent, her existence is unsubstantiated by reliable sources
Æthelflæd of Romsey	10th	West Saxon	Romsey	
Æthelgar of Canterbury	10th	West Saxon	Canterbury Christ Church	Cult attested in the resting-place list of Hugh Candidus
Æthelgyth of Coldingham	unknown	Northumbrian	Coldingham	
Æthelmod of Leominster	7th	Mercian	Leominster	
Æthelnoth of Canterbury	11th	West Saxon	Canterbury Christ Church	Although both Mabillon and the Bollandists counted him as a saint, there is no earlier evidence of a formal cult
Æthelred of Kent	7th	Kentish	Ramsey	
Æthelred of Mercia	8th	Mercian	Bradney	
Æthelsige of Ripon	unknown	Northumbrian	Ripon	Known only as sanctus Egelsi from a list of bishops resting at Ripon
Æthelstan of England	10th	West Saxon	Malmesbury	The saints cult of the famous English warrior-king is attested in a resting-place list, but is otherwise poorly documented
Æthelthryth of Ely	7th	East Anglian	Ely	Also called "St Audrey"
Æthelwold of Farne	7th	Northumbrian	Various	
Æthelwold of Lindisfarne	8th	Northumbrian	Lindisfarne	Bones left Lindisfarne in the 9th century with the community of St Cuthert; some bones were given to Westminster by King Edgar
Æthelwine of Athelney	7th	West Saxon	Athelney	
Æthelwine of Coln	unknown	Mercian	Coln St Aldwyn	
Æthelwine of Lindsey	7th	Mercian	unknown	There is no evidence of an early cult, but he is listed as a saint in Wilson's Martyrologie
Æthelwine of Sceldeforde	unknown	obscure	Sceldeforde	No identification of Sceldeforde is regarded as certain today
Æthelwold of Winchester	10th	West Saxon	Winchester Old Minster	
Æthelwynn of Sodbury	unknown	Mercian	Old Sodbury	
Aidan of Lindisfarne	7th	Gaelic / Northumbrian	Glastonbury	Bones moved from Lindisfarne to Glastonbury during time of Viking invasions
Alban	3rd	Romano-British	St Albans	
Albinus of Canterbury	8th	Kentish	Canterbury Christ Church	Evidence of cult comes from one resting-place list, but it is otherwise poorly documented
Albinus of Thorney	unknown	Mercian?	Thorney	May be Hwita, bishop of Lichfield
Alchhild of Middleham	unknown	Northumbrian	Middleham	Possibly a daughter of King Oswig
Alchmund of Hexham	8th	Northumbrian	Hexham	
Alchmund of Derby	9th	Northumbrian	Derby	
Aldatus of Oxford	6th	Romano-British?	Oxford / Gloucester	
Aldhelm of Sherbourne	8th	West Saxon	Malmesbury	
Alfred the Great	9th	West Saxon	Winchester	King of Wessex and Bretwalda. Saint by popular acclaim only, never formally canonised. Relics were lost at the Dissolution of the Monasteries.
Amphibalus of St Albans	3rd	Romano-British?	St Albans	Body at Aldeminstre in the Domesday Breviate resting-place list; body 'discovered' at St Albans in 1178
Arilda of Oldbury	unknown	Romano-British?	Gloucester	
Arwald	7th	Isle of Wight	unknown	Martyrs, sons of Arwald, the prince of the Isle of Wight, just off the English coast. The martyrs are called Arwald because their proper names are not known. They were slain after Baptism by King Cædwalla, who was a pagan.
Athwulf of Thorney	7th	East Anglian	Thorney	
Augustine of Canterbury	7th	Roman	Canterbury St Augustine's	
Avbur of Stallingborough	unknown	obscure	Stallingborough	
Balthere of Tyningham	8th	Northumbrian	Tyninghame / Durham	
Balthild of Romsey	7th	Frankish / East Anglian	Romsey	
Barloc of Norbury	unknown	British	Norbury	
Beda of Jarrow	8th	Northumbrian	Jarrow / Durham / Glastonbury	
Bega of Copeland	unknown	Gaelic / Northumbrian	St Bees	
Benedict Biscop	7th	Northumbrian	Thorney	
Benignus of Glastonbury	unknown	West Saxon	Glastonbury	Also called Beonna
Beocca of Chertsey	9th	West Saxon	Chertsey	9th
Beonna of Breedon	9th	Mercian	Breedon-on-the-Hill	
Beorhthelm of Stafford	unknown	Mercian	Stafford	
Beorhthelm of Shaftesbury	unknown	West Saxon	Shaftesbury	Some possibility that he is a 10th-century West Saxon bishop, several bearing this name
Beornstan the Archdeacon	unknown	Kentish	Canterbury St Augustine's	The saint-list "Catalogus Sanctorum in Anglia Pausantium" mentions an archdeacon called Byrnstan or Beornstan resting at St Augustine's
Beornstan of Winchester	10th	West Saxon	Winchester Old Minster	
Beornwald of Bampton	10th	West Saxon	Bampton	
Bercthun of Beverley	8th	Northumbrian	Beverley	
Berhtwald of Canterbury	8th	Kentish	Canterbury St Augustine's	
Bertha of Kent	7th	Frankish / Kentish	Canterbury St Augustine's	Mention in the resting-place list of Hugh Candidus
Billfrith of Lindisfarne	8th	Northumbrian	Durham	
Birinus of Dorchester	7th	Roman	Winchester Old Minster	
Blaise	4th	Roman	Canterbury Christ Church	Relics of Saint Blaise were held by Canterbury Christ Church, thought to have been brought from Rome in 908 by Archbishop Plegmund
Blitha of Martham	unknown	East Anglian	Martham	Mother of St Walstan
Boisil of Melrose	7th	Gaelic / Northumbrian	Melrose / Durham	
Boniface	8th	West Saxon	Mainz / Fulda / Dokkum, Frisia	Famous for being the "Apostle of Germany" for his missionary efforts among the German people. Originally from Crediton in Devon and named Wynfryth until Pope Gregory II dubbed him Boniface. Martyred in Dokkum in Frisia by bandits.
Bosa of York	8th	Northumbrian	York	
Botwine of Ripon	8th	Northumbrian	Ripon	
Botwulf of Thorney	7th	East Anglian	Thorney	
Brannoc of Braunton	unknown	British	Braunton	
Branwalator of Milton	unknown	British	Milton Abbas	
Ceadda of Lichfield	7th	Northumbrian	Lichfield	
Ceatta of Lichfield	unknown	obscure	Lichfield	Possibly a duplication of Ceadda (above)
Cedd of Lichfield	7th	Northumbrian	Lichfield	
Centwine of Wessex	7th	West Saxon	Glastonbury	In the list of saints entitled "Catalogus Sanctorum in Anglia Pausantium", he is listed resting at Glastonbury Abbey
Ceolfrith of Monkwearmouth	8th	Northumbrian	Langres / Glastonbury / Monkwearmouth	
Ceolwulf of Northumbria	8th	Northumbrian	Lindisfarne	
Cett of Oundle	unknown	obscure	Oundle	
Credan of Bodmin	unknown	British	Bodmin	
Cissa of Crowland	8th	East Anglian	Thorney	
Coenwulf of Mercia	9th	Mercian	Winchcombe	
Congar of Congresbury	unknown	British	Congresbury	
Cotta of Breedon	8th	Mercian	Breedon-on-the-Hill	
Credan of Evesham	8th	Mercian	Evesham	
Cuthbald of Peterborough	8th	East Anglian	Peterborough	
Cuthbert of Lindisfarne	7th	Northumbrian	Durham	Bones originally at Lindisfarne, at various places including Carlisle, Norham, Crayke and Chester-le-Street, before settling at Durham in the late 10th century for the remainder of the Middle Ages
Cuthburh of Wimborne	8th	West Saxon	Wimborne	
Cuthflæd of Lyminster	unknown	South Saxon	Lyminster	
Cuthmann of Steyning	unknown	South Saxon	Steyning	
Cwenburh of Wimborne	8th	West Saxon	Wimborne	
Cyneburh of Castor	7th	Mercian	Peterborough	
Cyneburh of Gloucester	7th	Mercian	Gloucester	
Cynehelm of Mercia	9th	Mercian	Winchcombe	
Cyneswith of Peterborough	7th	Mercian	Peterborough	
Dachuna of Bodmin	unknown	British?	Bodmin	A virgin saint venerated in Cornwall, Dachuna is known from the list of resting-places of Hugh Candidus, authored around 1155. Dachuna, along with Medan and Credan, were allegedly associates of Saint Petroc, whom they rested alongside at Bodmin Priory. There is no documentation of a Dachuna in Cornwall beyond Hugh Candidus' list; male bishops and saints with similar names are known in Ireland. According to Nicholas Orme, Hugh Candidus may have conflated another location with Bodmin and incorrectly ascribed the saints to the priory.
Decuman of Watchet	unknown	British	Watchet	
Deusdedit of Canterbury	7th	Kentish	Canterbury St Augustine's / Leominster	
Diuma of Charlbury	7th	Gaelic / Mercian	Charlbury	
Domnanuerdh of Beckley	unknown	obscure	Beckley	
Dryhthelm of Melrose	8th	Northumbrian	Melrose	Famous for the vision of the afterlife attributed to him by Bede; evidence for cult limited, but he is mentioned in the resting-place list of Hugh Candidus
Dunstan of Canterbury	10th	West Saxon	Canterbury St Augustine's	
Eadberht of Lindisfarne	7th	Northumbrian	Lindisfarne	According to tradition, his bones were taken from Lindisfarne in the late 9th century
Eadburh of Bicester	7th	Mercian	Bicester	
Eadburh of Pershore	unknown	Mercian	Pershore	possibly identified with Eadburh of Winchester
Eadburh of Southwell	unknown	Mercian	Southwell	
Eadburh of Thanet	8th	Kentish	Lyminge	
Eadburh of Winchester	10th	West Saxon	Winchester Nunnaminster	
Eadfrith of Leominster	7th	Northumbrian	Leominster	
Eadfrith of Lindisfarne	8th	Northumbrian	Lindisfarne	Tradition has it that his bones were taken from Lindisfarne in the late 9th century
Eadgar of England	10th	West Saxon	Glastonbury	
Eadgyth of Aylesbury	unknown	Mercian	Aylesbury	
Eadgyth of Polesworth	10th	West Saxon	Polesworth	
Eadgyth of Wilton	10th	West Saxon	Wilton	
Eadmund of East Anglia	9th	East Anglian	Bury St Edmunds	
Eadmund the Confessor	unknown	obscure	unknown	Known only in the litany from Lambeth Palace MS 427, a 15th-century addition to a psalter of the 11th century
Eadnoth of Ramsey	11th	East Anglian	Ely	
Eadthryth of Grantham	unknown	obscure	Grantham	
Eadweard the Confessor	11th	West Saxon	Westminster	
Eadweard the Martyr	10th	West Saxon	Shaftesbury	
Eadweard of Maugersbury	unknown	Mercian	Maugersbury / Stow-on-the-Wold	
Eadwine of Northumbria	7th	Northumbrian	Whitby / York	
Eadwold of Cerne	9th	West Saxon	Cerne Abbas	
Ealdberht of Ripon	8th	Northumbrian	Ripon / Peterborough	
Ealdgyth of Stortford	unknown	Mercian	Bishops Stortford	
Eanmund	8th	Northumbrian	unknown	
Eanswith of Folkestone	7th	Kentish	Folkestone	
Earconwald	7th	Mercian	London / Chertsey	
Eardwulf of Northumbria	9th	Northumbrian	Breedon-on-the-Hill	
Earmund of Stoke Fleming	unknown	West Saxon	Stoke Fleming	
Eata of Hexham	7th	Northumbrian	Hexham	
Ecgberht of Ripon	8th	Northumbrian	Ripon	
Ecgwine of Evesham	8th	Mercian	Evesham	
Echa of Crayke	8th	Gaelic / Northumbrian	Crayke	
Edor of Chertsey	9th	West Saxon	Chertsey	
Elfin of Warrington	unknown	British	Warrington	
Eoda	7th	Northumbrian	unknown	may be identical with St. Oda
Eormengyth of Thanet	7th	Kentish	Minster-in-Thanet	
Eosterwine of Monkwearmouth	7th	Northumbrian	Monkwearmouth	
Evorhilda	unknown	West Saxon	Poppleton	
Felix of Dommoc	7th	Frankish	Ramsey	
Firmin of North Crawley	unknown	Roman?	North Crawley / Thorney	Compare Fermin, martyr and bishop of Amiens
Florentius of Peterborough	unknown	Roman	Peterborough	According to the Anglo-Saxon Chronicle MS E, his relics were transferred from Bonneval Abbey to Peterborough in 1013; he is perhaps Florentius of Sedun, martyred by the Vandals
Freomund of Mercia	9th	Mercian	Dunstable	
Frithestan of Winchester	10th	West Saxon	Winchester Old Minster	
Frithuric of Breedon	7th	Mercian	Breedon-on-the-Hill	
Frithuswith of Oxford	8th	Mercian	Oxford	
Frithuwold of Chertsey	7th	Mercian	Chertsey	
Fursey of Cnobheresburg	7th	Gaelic / East Anglian	Péronne	
Grimbald of St Bertin	10th	Frankish	Winchester New Minster	
Guthlac of Crowland	8th	East Anglian	Crowland	
Hadrian of Canterbury	8th	Roman	Canterbury St Augustine's	Born in the Roman exarchate of Africa, conquered by the Arabs in Hadrian's lifetime
Hædde of Winchester	8th	West Saxon	Winchester Old Minster	
Hæmma of Leominster	7th	Mercian	Leominster	
Heahmund of Sherborne	9th	West Saxon	Keynsham	
Hereberht of Huntingdon	unknown	obscure	unknown	
Herefrith of Thorney	unknown	East Anglian	Thorney	May have been a bishop of Lindsey
Hilda of Whitby	7th	Northumbrian	Whitby / Glastonbury	
Hildeburh	7th	Mercia	Dee Estuary	
Hildelith of Barking	8th	East Saxon	Barking	
Hiurmine of Blythburgh	7th	East Anglian	Blythburgh / Bury St Edmunds	
Honorius of Canterbury	7th	Roman	Canterbury St Augustine's	
Huna of Thorney	7th	East Anglian	Thorney	
Humbert of Stokenham	unknown	West Saxon	Stokenham	
Hwita of Whitchurch Canonicorum	unknown	West Saxon	Whitchurch Canonicorum	
Hygebald of Lindsey	7th	obscure	Hibaldstow	
Hyglac	8th	Northumbrian	unknown	
Indract of Glastonbury	9th	Gaelic / West Saxon	Glastonbury	
Inicium	unknown	obscure	Thorney	Body appears to have been in Bochesuurtha, perhaps either Boxworth or Buckworth, before resting at Thorney
Ivo of Ramsey	unknown	British	Ramsey	
Iwig of Wilton	7th	Northumbrian	Wilton	
Jermin	8th	East Anglian	Bury St. Edmunds	Killed at the Battle of Bulcamp, his body was translated from Blythburgh. Also known as Jurmin
John of Beverley	8th	Northumbrian	Beverley	
John the Sage	unknown	obscure	Malmesbury	William of Malmesbury believed this saint to be John Scotus Erigena, while historian Michael Lapidge has suggested John the Old Saxon, scholar of Alfred the Great
Jordan of Bristol	unknown	obscure	College Green, Bristol	Jordan is only attested to as a saint of the Anglo-Saxon era in a 15th-century hymn and in the writings of later antiquarians.
Judoc of Winchester	7th	British	Winchester New Minster	
Jurmin	7th	East Anglian	Killed in Battle with Penda	Prince of East Anglia, Son of King Anna
Justus of Canterbury	7th	Roman	Canterbury St Augustine's	
Juthwara of Sherborne	6th	Dumnonia, sub-Roman British	Sherborne	
Laurence of Canterbury	7th	Roman	Canterbury St Augustine's	
Leofwynn of Bishopstone	7th	South Saxon	Bishopstone	
Mærwynn of Romsey	10th	West Saxon	Romsey	
Maildub of Malmesbury	7th	Gaelic / West Saxon	Malmesbury	
Margaret of Wessex	11th	West Saxon	Dunfermline	
Mellitus of Canterbury	7th	Roman	Canterbury St Augustine's	
Melorius of Amesbury	unknown	British	Amesbury	
Merefin	unknown	Mercian	unknown	
Mildburh of Wenlock	8th	Mercian	Wenlock	
Mildgyth	8th	Mercian	unknown	
Mildrith of Thanet	8th	Mercian	Minster-in-Thanet / Canterbury St Augustine's	
Milred of Worcester	8th	Mercian	Berkswell	
Modwenna of Burton	unknown	Gaelic / Mercian	Burton	
Monegunda of Watton	6th	Frankish	Watton	
Nectan of Hartland	unknown	British	Hartland	
Neot	unknown	British	St Neots	
Nothhelm of Canterbury	8th	Kentish	Canterbury St Augustine's	
Oda of Canterbury	10th	Anglo-Norse	Canterbury Christ Church	
Odwulf of Evesham	9th	Frisian	Evesham	
Osana of Howden	8th?	Northumbrian	Howden	
Osburh of Coventry	unknown	Mercian	Coventry	
Osgyth	7th	East Saxon	Chich / Aylesbury	
Osthryth	7th	Northumbrian	Bardney	
Oswald of Northumbria	7th	Northumbrian	Lindisfarne / Gloucester / various	Body rested at Bardney, hands at Bamburgh and head at Lindisfarne in the time of Bede; body was translated to Gloucester in 909; the right-arm was later at Peterborough, with the head at Durham and some other bones at Glastonbury
Oswald of Worcester	10th	Anglo-Norse	Worcester	
Oswine of Northumbria	7th	Northumbrian	Tynemouth / Durham	Despite a brief period at Durham, Oswine rested at Tynemouth Priory; Durham possessed the head
Pandionia of Eltisley	unknown	obscure	Eltisley	
Patrick	unknown	Romano-British	Glastonbury (/Armagh)	Body was alleged to be buried at Glastonbury in the Anglo-Saxon period, though it was discovered by John de Courcy and translated to Armagh Cathedral in 1185
Paulinus of York	7th	Roman	Rochester	
Pega of Peakirk	8th	East Anglian	Peakirk	
Rayne	unknown	obscure	unknown	
Regenhere of Northampton	9th	East Anglian	Northampton	
Ruffinus of Stone	7th	Mercia	Stone	
Rumon of Tavistock	unknown	British	Ruan Lanihorne / Tavistock	
Rumwold of Buckingham	unknown	Mercian	Buckingham	
Samson of Dol	6th	British	Milton Abbas	
Sæbbi of London	7th	East Saxon	London	Cult uncertain
Sativola of Exeter	6th	Dumnonia Sub-Roman British	Exeter	Venerated throughout the Middle Ages in Devon, she has been linked with the 6th Cornish anchoress Sitofolla, sister of Paul Aurelian
Seaxburh of Ely	8th	East Anglian	Ely	
Sicgred of Ripon	8th	Northumbrian	Ripon / Peterborough	
Sigeburh of Thanet	8th	Kentish	Minster-in-Thanet	
Sigfrith of Monkwearmouth	7th	Northumbrian	Monkwearmouth	
Swithhun of Winchester	9th	West Saxon	Winchester Old Minster	
Tatberht of Ripon	8th	Northumbrian	Ripon / Peterborough	
Tancred of Thorney	9th	East Anglian	Thorney	
Torthred of Thorney	9th	East Anglian	Thorney	
Tova of Thorney	9th	East Anglian	Thorney	
Theodore of Canterbury	7th	Roman	Canterbury St Augustine's	
Tibba of Ryhall	7th	Mercian	Ryhall / Peterborough	
Ultan the Scribe	8th	Gaelic / Northumbrian	unknown	Gaelic scribe-priest known only from the 9th-century work of a monk named Æthelwulf, De Abbatibus
Urith of Chittlehampton	unknown	British	Chittlehampton	In Latin, Hyaritha; name probably represents Welsh Iwerydd
Wendreda	7th	East Anglian	Ely/March, Cambridgeshire	
Werburh of Chester	8th	Mercian	Hanbury / Chester	
Wærstan	unknown	Mercian	Great Malvern	
Walstan of Bawburgh	unknown	East Anglian	Bawburgh	
Wigstan of Repton	9th	Mercian	Repton / Evesham	
Wihtberht	8th	Northumbrian	Ripon	
Wihtburh of Ely	8th	East Anglian	Ely	
Wihtred of Thorney	unknown	obscure	Thorney	
Wilfrith of Hexham	8th	Northumbrian	Ripon / Canterbury Christ Church	
Wilfrith II	8th	Northumbrian	Ripon	
Wilgils of Ripon	7th	Northumbrian	Ripon / Peterborough	
Wilgyth of Cholsey	6th	Dumnonia, sub-Roman Britain	Cholsey	
Wulfgar of Peterborough	unknown	obscure	Peterborough	
Wulfhad of Stone	7th	obscure	Stone	
Wulfhild of Barking	11th	Mercian	Barking	
Wulfram of Grantham	8th	Frankish	Grantham	
Wulfric of Holme	10th	East Anglian	Holme	
Wulfsige of Sherborne	11th	West Saxon	Sherborne	
Wulfthryth	11th	West Saxon	Wilton	
Wynthryth of March	unknown	obscure	March / Ely	

- Anglo-Norse, of mixed English and Scandinavian extraction characteristic of northern and central England in the later Anglo-Saxon era
- British, from the British population native to pre-Germanic England, including Welsh, Cornish, Cumbrian and Celtic Armoricans, as well as saints from regions of England Anglicized very late
- East Anglian, ethnically English and either from or strong associated with the East Anglian region of early medieval England, modern Norfolk, Suffolk as well as some of Cambridgeshire or Lincolnshire
- East Saxon, ethnically English and either from or strong associated with the East Saxon region of early medieval England
- Frankish, from the Frankish kingdom in Gaul, including native Latin-speakers but excluding Bretons
- Frisian, from the Frisian region of early medieval Europe
- Gaelic, in origin a Gaelic-speaking Celt from Ireland or northern Britain
- Kentish, ethnically English and either from or strong associated with the Kentish region of early medieval England
- Mercian, ethnically English and either from or strong associated with the Mercian region of early medieval England
- Northumbrian, ethnically English and either from or strong associated with the Northumbrian region of early medieval England
- Roman, from the Roman (or 'Byzantine') Empire, excluding Britain
- Romano-British, from Roman Britain and neither clearly British or clearly Latin
- South Saxon, ethnically English and either from or strongly associated with the South Saxon region of early medieval England
- West Saxon, ethnically English and either from or strongly associated with the West Saxon region of early medieval England

== See also ==
- Secgan
- List of saints of Ireland
- List of Cornish saints
- List of Welsh saints
- List of saints of the Canary Islands
