= Bonneval Abbey =

Bonneval Abbey may refer to:

- Bonneval Abbey (Eure-et-Loir), a former Benedictine monastery in Bonneval, Eure-et-Loir, France
- Bonneval Abbey (Aveyron), founded as a monastery of Cistercian monks in Le Cayrol, Aveyron, France, now inhabited by Trappistine nuns
