= Florentius of Peterborough =

Catholic saint

Saint Frithestan

Saint, Martyr
- Died: 7th Century
- Venerated in: Catholic Church
- Feast: 27 September

Florentius of Peterborough was a seventh-century saint and martyr.

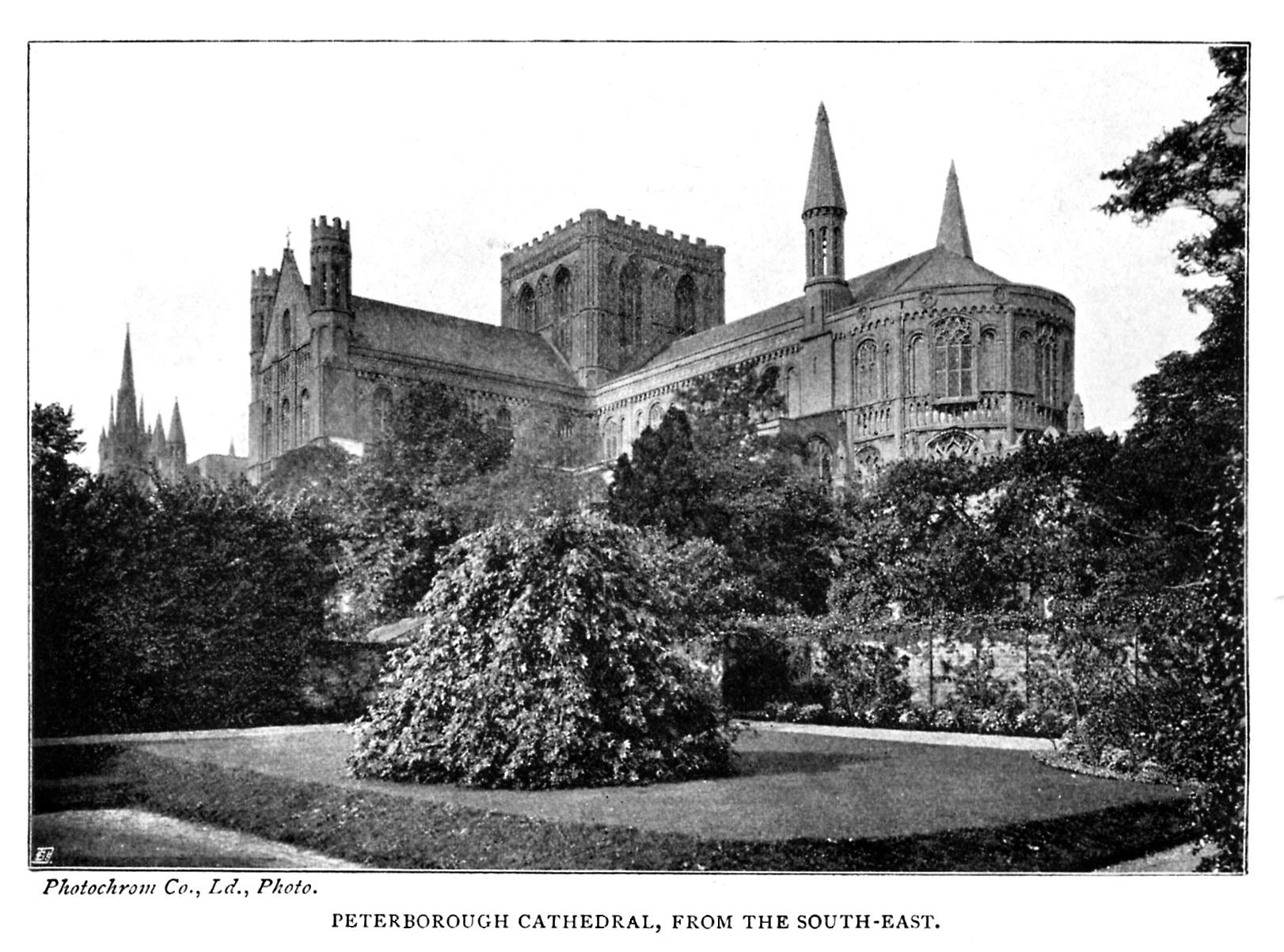
Peterborough Cathedral from the southeast c. 1898.

Florentius was a Roman, and is known to history mainly through the hagiography of the Secgan Manuscript.

According to the Anglo-Saxon Chronicle manuscript E, Florentius' relics were purchased from Bonneval Abbey and moved to Peterborough Cathedral in 1013 or 1016 by Abbot Ælfsi of Peterborough.

Florentius' was venerated at Peterborough along with Cyneswith and Cyniburg. However, his feast day on 27 September might suggest that he was in reality Florentinus of Sedun, who was martyred by the Vandal persecution.
