= Ælfgifu of Exeter =

Anglo-Saxon saint

Ælfgifu of Exeter was an Anglo-Saxon saint, whose relics were held by Exeter Cathedral. She is mentioned in the Old English Exeter relic-list as "the holy servant of Christ ... who would daily perform her confession before she went into church". It is possible that she is the 10th-century royal abbess, Ælfgifu of Shaftesbury wife of Edmund I (as one 12th-century writer believed), but it is "more likely" according to historian John Blair that she was not.

== See also ==
- List of Anglo-Saxon saints
