= Botwine =

Northumbrian saint

Abbot of Ripon
- Died: c. 785
- Major shrine: Ripon and Peterborough
- Feast: unknown

Botwine (died 785 or 786) was a Northumbrian saint venerated at Ripon and Peterborough. He is well documented as a priest, and latter Abbot of Ripon. The Anglo-Saxon Chronicle recension E, recorded his death in the 780s (probably for 786) in one of three Ripon abbatial obits derived from a chronicle of Northumbrian origin. Following the death of St Botwine in 786AD, his replacement, Ealdberht was elected and consecrated Abbot. Ealdberht died in 788AD, and was himself succeeded as Abbot by St. Sigered of Ripon.

The late 10th- and early 11th-century writer Byrhtferth of Ramsey in his Vita sancti Oswaldi claimed that Oswald of Worcester, Archbishop of York, discovered Botwine's relics at the monastery of Ripon. Oswald made a magnificent reliquary in which he placed the relics of Botwine with Wilfrid, Tiatberht, Alberht, Sigered and Vilden. This account is described by historian Michael Lapidge as "problematical" on other points. as it is known that in the 12th-century Peterborough Abbey also possessed some relics of Botwine.
