= Peterborough Cathedral =

- Cathedral Church of St Peter, St Paul and St Andrew
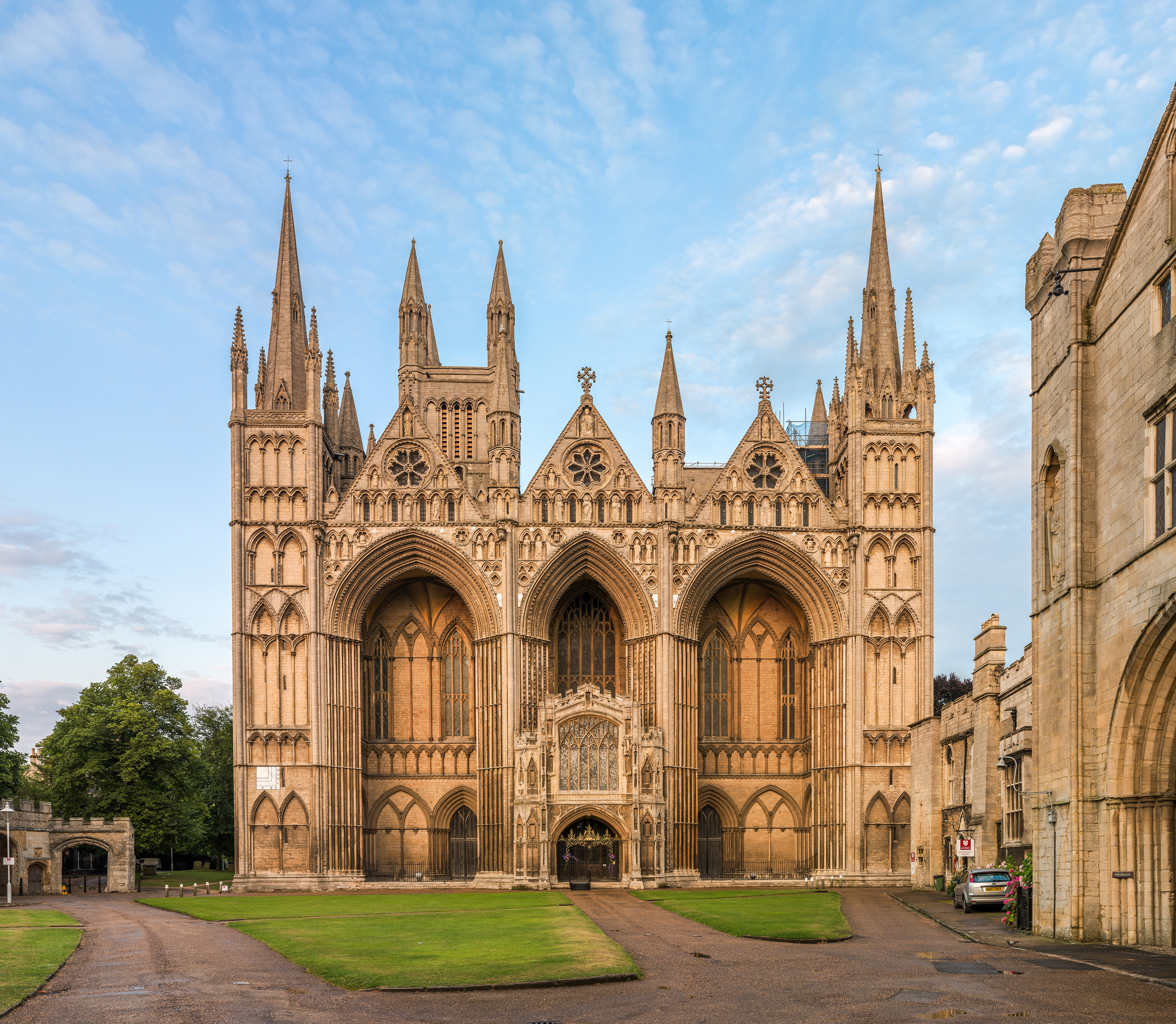
- Peterborough Cathedral
- Peterborough Cathedral
- 52°34′21″N 0°14′20″W
- OS grid reference: TL 19416 98645
- Location: Peterborough, Cambridgeshire
- Country: England
- Denomination: Church of England
- Previous denomination: Roman Catholic
- Website: Peterborough Cathedral

History
- Former name: Peterborough Abbey
- Dedication: St Peter, St Paul, St Andrew
- Consecrated: 1238

Architecture
- Style: Romanesque/Gothic
- Years built: 1118–1237

Specifications
- Length: 482 ft (147 m)
- Height: 44 m (144 ft)

Administration
- Province: Canterbury
- Diocese: Peterborough

Clergy
- Bishop: Deborah Mary Sellin
- Dean: Christopher Dalliston

Peterborough Cathedral, properly the Cathedral Church of St Peter, St Paul and St Andrew, and formerly known as Peterborough Abbey or St Peter's Abbey, is a cathedral in Peterborough, Cambridgeshire, in the United Kingdom. The seat of the Anglican Bishop of Peterborough, it is dedicated to the Apostles Saint Peter, Saint Paul, and Saint Andrew, whose statues look down from the three high gables of the West Front. Founded in the Anglo-Saxon period as a minster it became one of England's most important Benedictine abbeys, becoming a cathedral only in 1542. Its architecture is mainly Norman, following a rebuilding in the 12th century. Alongside the cathedrals of Durham and Ely, it is one of the most important 12th-century buildings in England to have remained largely intact, despite extensions and restoration, and is one of the nation's best preserved pre-Reformation abbeys.

Peterborough Cathedral is known for its imposing Early English Gothic West Front (façade) which, with its three enormous arches, is without architectural precedent and with no direct successor. The appearance is slightly asymmetrical, as one of the two towers that rise from behind the façade was never completed (the tower on the right as one faces the building), but this is only visible from a distance.

== History ==
=== Anglo-Saxon origins ===
The original church, known as "Medeshamstede", was founded in the reign of the Anglo-Saxon King Peada of the Middle Angles in about 655 AD, as one of the first centres of Christianity in central England. The monastic settlement with which the church was associated lasted at least until 870, when it was supposedly destroyed by Vikings. In an alcove of the New Building, an extension of the eastern end, lies an ancient stone carving: the Hedda Stone. This medieval carving of 12 monks, six on each side, commemorates the destruction of the Monastery and the death of the Abbot and Monks when the area was sacked by the Vikings in 864. The Hedda Stone was likely carved sometime after the raid, when the monastery slipped into decline.

In the mid-10th century, monastic revival (during which churches at Ely and Ramsey were also refounded) a Benedictine Abbey was created and endowed in 966, principally by Athelwold, Bishop of Winchester, from what remained of the earlier church, with "a basilica [church] there furbished with suitable structures of halls, and enriched with surrounding lands" and more extensive buildings which saw the aisle built out to the west with a second tower added. The original central tower was, however, retained. It was dedicated to St Peter and surrounded by a palisade, called a burgh, hence the town surrounding the abbey was eventually named Peter-burgh. The community was further revived in 972 by Dunstan, Archbishop of Canterbury.

This newer church had as its major focal point a substantial western tower with a "Rhenish helm" and was largely constructed of ashlars. Only a small section of the foundations of the Anglo-Saxon church remain beneath the south transept but there are several significant artefacts, including Anglo-Saxon carvings such as the Hedda Stone, from the earlier building.

In 2008, Anglo-Saxon grave markers were reported to have been found by workmen repairing a wall in the cathedral precincts. The grave markers are said to date to the 11th century, and probably belonged to "townsfolk".

=== Norman and medieval architectural evolution ===
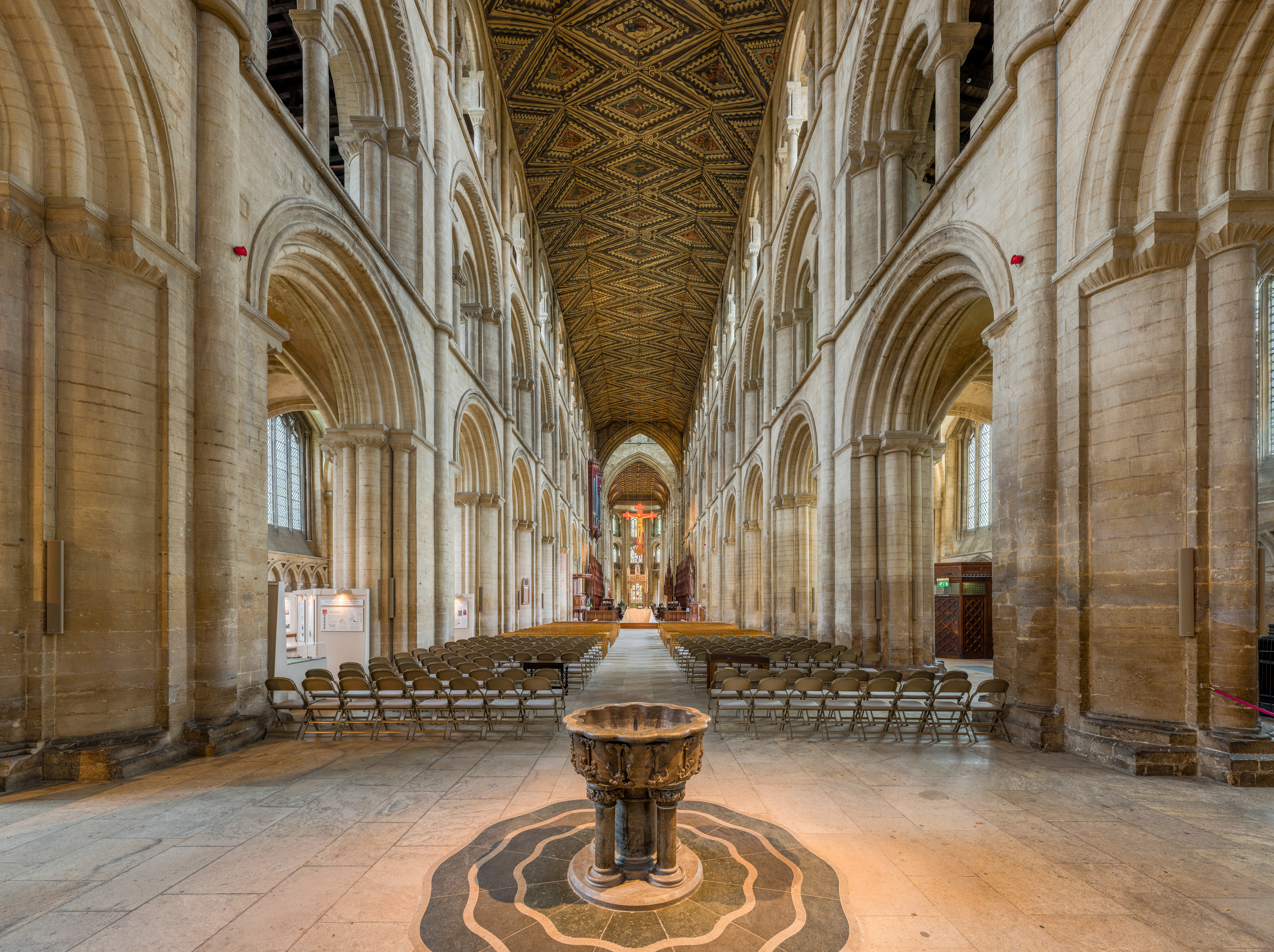
The nave

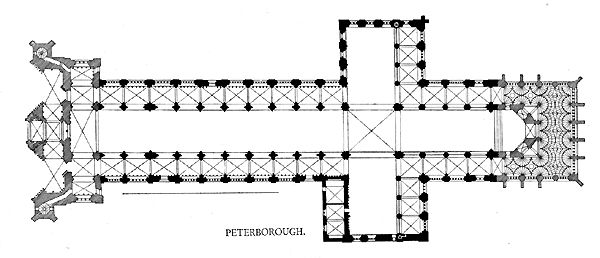
Plan

Although damaged during the struggle between the Norman invaders and local folk-hero, Hereward the Wake, it was repaired and continued to thrive until destroyed by an accidental fire in 1116. This event necessitated the building of a new church in the Norman style, begun by Abbot John de Sais on 8 March 1118 (Old Style). By 1193, the building was completed to the western end of the Nave, including the central tower and the decorated wooden ceiling of the nave. The ceiling, completed between 1230 and 1250, still survives. It is unique in Britain and one of only four such ceilings in the whole of Europe. It has been over-painted twice, once in 1745, then in 1834, but still retains the character and style of the original. (The painted nave ceiling of Ely Cathedral, by contrast, is entirely a Victorian creation.)

The church was largely built of Barnack limestone from quarries on its own land, and it was paid annually for access to these quarries by the builders of Ely Cathedral and Ramsey Abbey in thousands of eels (e.g. 4,000 each year by Ramsey). Cathedral historians believe that part of the placing of the church in the location it is in is due to the easy ability to transfer quarried stones by river and then to the existing site allowing it to grow without being relocated.

Then, after completing the Western transept and adding the Great West Front Portico in 1237, the medieval masons switched over to the new Gothic style. Apart from changes to the windows, the insertion of a porch to support the free-standing pillars of the portico and the addition of a "new" building at the east end around the beginning of the 16th century, the structure of the building remains essentially as it was on completion almost 800 years ago. The completed building was consecrated in 1238 by Robert Grosseteste, Bishop of Lincoln, within whose diocese it then fell.

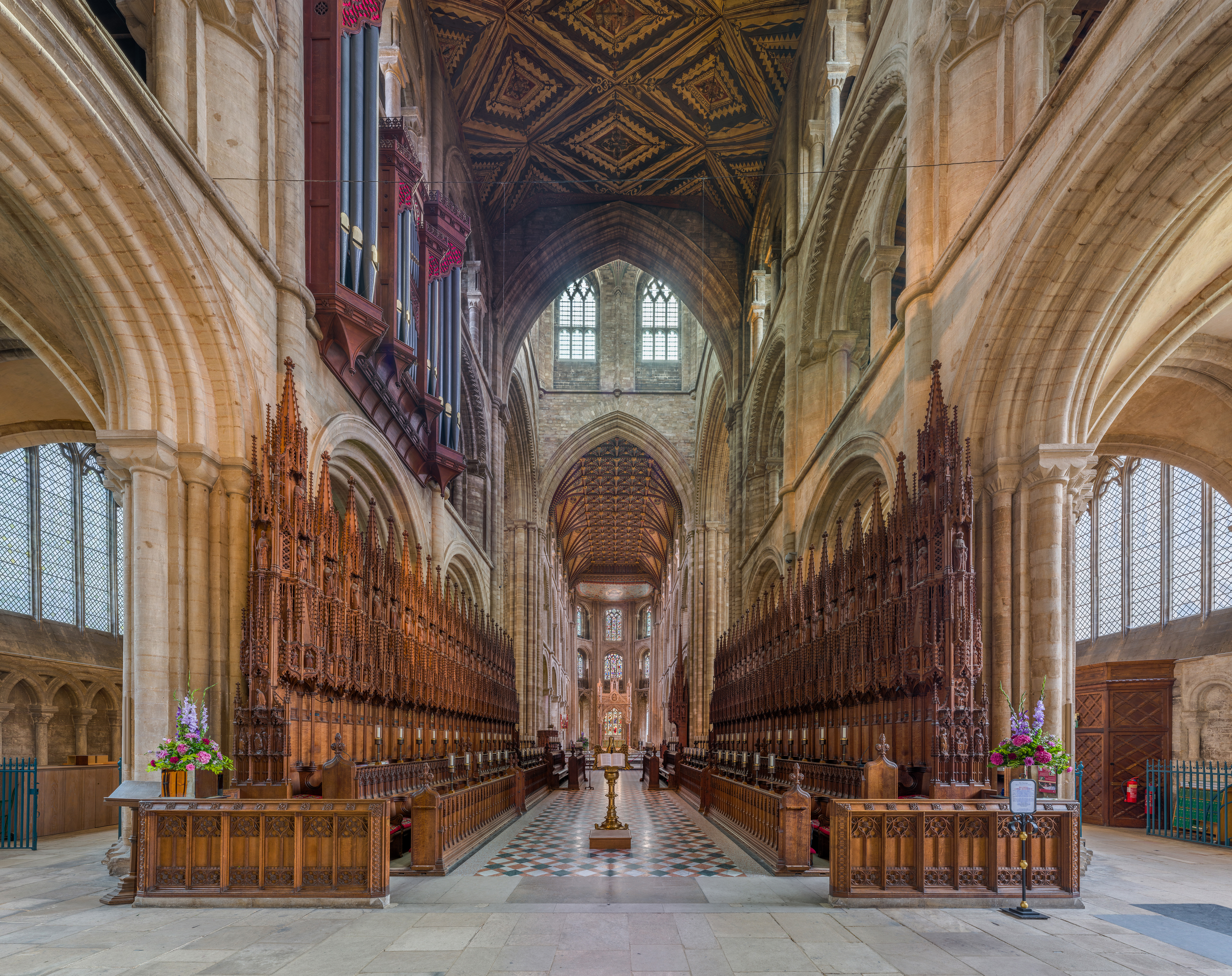
The choir

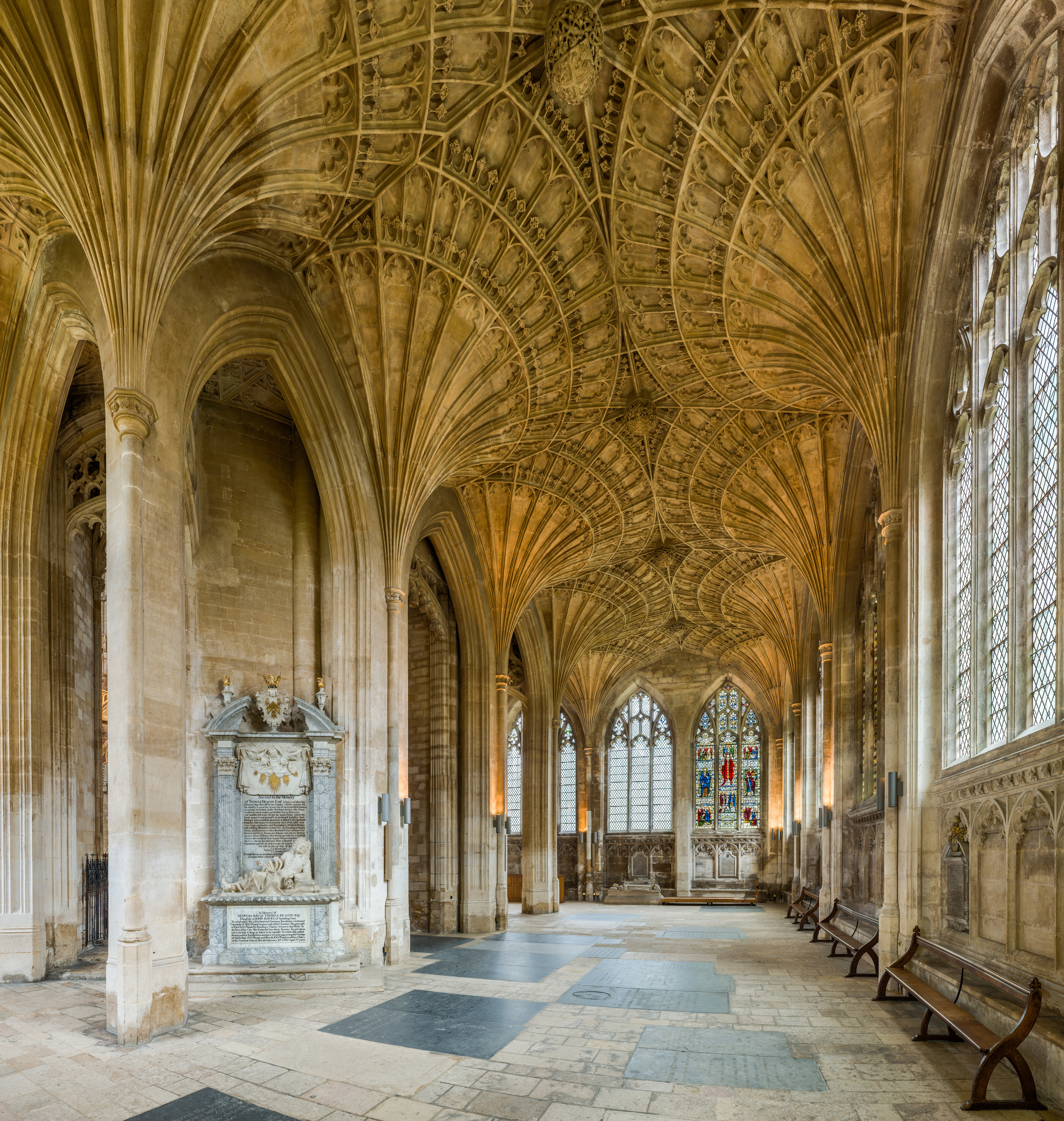
The New Building, showing fan vaulting

The trio of arches forming the Great West Front, the defining image of Peterborough Cathedral, is unrivalled in medieval architecture. The line of spires behind it, topping an unprecedented four towers, evolved for more practical reasons. Chief amongst them was the wish to retain the earlier Norman towers, which became obsolete when the Gothic front was added. Instead of being demolished and replaced with new stretches of wall, these old towers were retained and embellished with cornices and other gothic decor, while two new towers were added to create a continuous frontage. The south-west corner of the cloisters at Peterborough Cathedral contains a carved gateway, executed in the Early English Gothic style, the doorway is decorated with stiff-leaf foliage and carved mythical beasts, including stone dragons positioned along its sides. The entrance originally provided access to the Abbot’s lodging, a building that later became the Bishop’s Palace.

The Norman tower was rebuilt in the Decorated Gothic style in about 1350–1380 (its main beams and roof bosses survive) with two tiers of Romanesque windows combined into a single set of Gothic windows, with the turreted cap and pinnacles removed and replaced by battlements. Between 1496 and 1508, the Presbytery roof was replaced and the "New Building", a rectangular building built around the end of the Norman eastern apse, with Perpendicular fan vaulting (probably designed by John Wastell, the architect of King's College Chapel, Cambridge and the Bell Harry Tower at Canterbury Cathedral), was added.

=== Monastic life ===
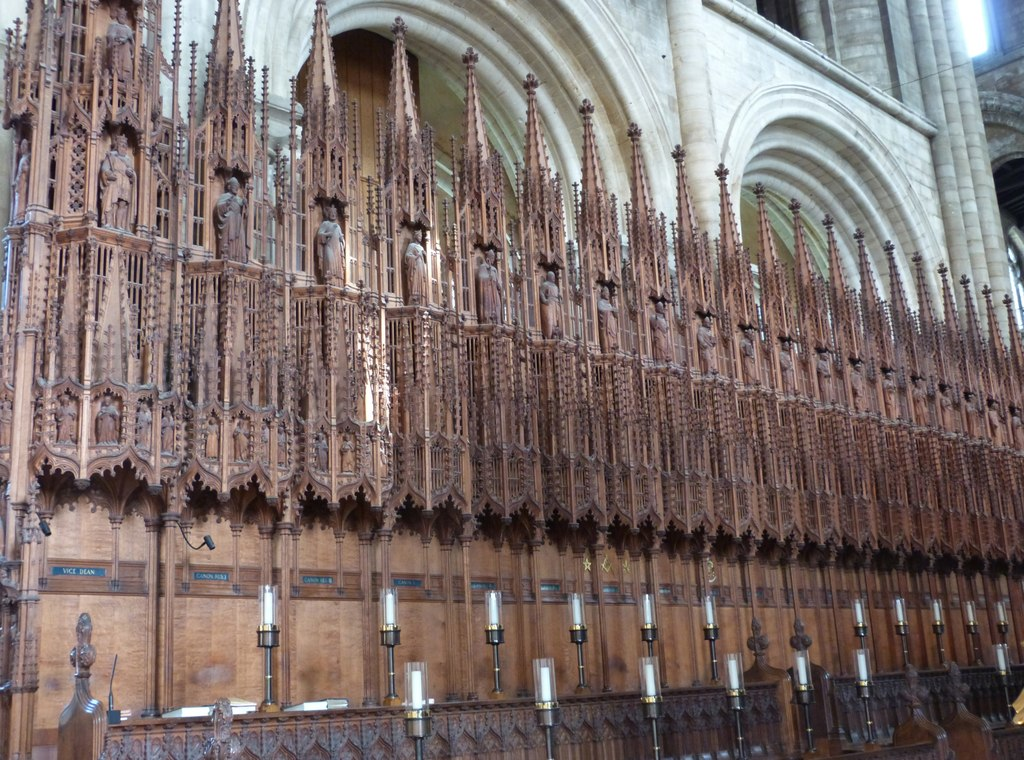
The 19th-century choir stalls of the cathedral retain some surviving elements of the medieval stalls where the monks held their services.

As in all Benedictine abbeys, the monks of Peterborough made vows of stability in the abbey until death. The community was governed by the Rule of St Benedict and was focused chiefly on the daily services of the Conventual Mass and the Liturgy of the Hours in the church. Meals and meetings were also important ritual events, with monks eating in silence while listening to readings from spiritual texts. Outside of this schedule they engaged in scholarship, education, pastoral care for the local community, and other kinds of work with daily time set aside for recreation, an opportunity to socialise with other members of the community and with guests. The duty of welcoming guests and pilgrims is a cornerstone of the Benedictine Rule and at Peterborough this was probably the primary focus of activity.

Pilgrimage to Peterborough was common because of the abbey's many relics. The existing mid-12th-century records of Hugh Candidus, a monk, list the Abbey's reliquaries as including two pieces of swaddling clothes which wrapped the baby Jesus, pieces of Jesus' manger, a part of the five loaves which fed the 5,000, a piece of the raiment of Mary the mother of Jesus, a piece of Aaron's rod, and relics of St Peter, St Paul and St Andrew – to whom the church is dedicated.

The supposed arm of Oswald of Northumbria disappeared from its chapel, probably during the Reformation, despite a watch-tower having been built for monks to guard its reliquary. Various contact relics of Thomas Becket were brought from Canterbury in a special reliquary by its Prior Benedict (who had witnessed Becket's assassination) when he was "promoted" to Abbot of Peterborough.

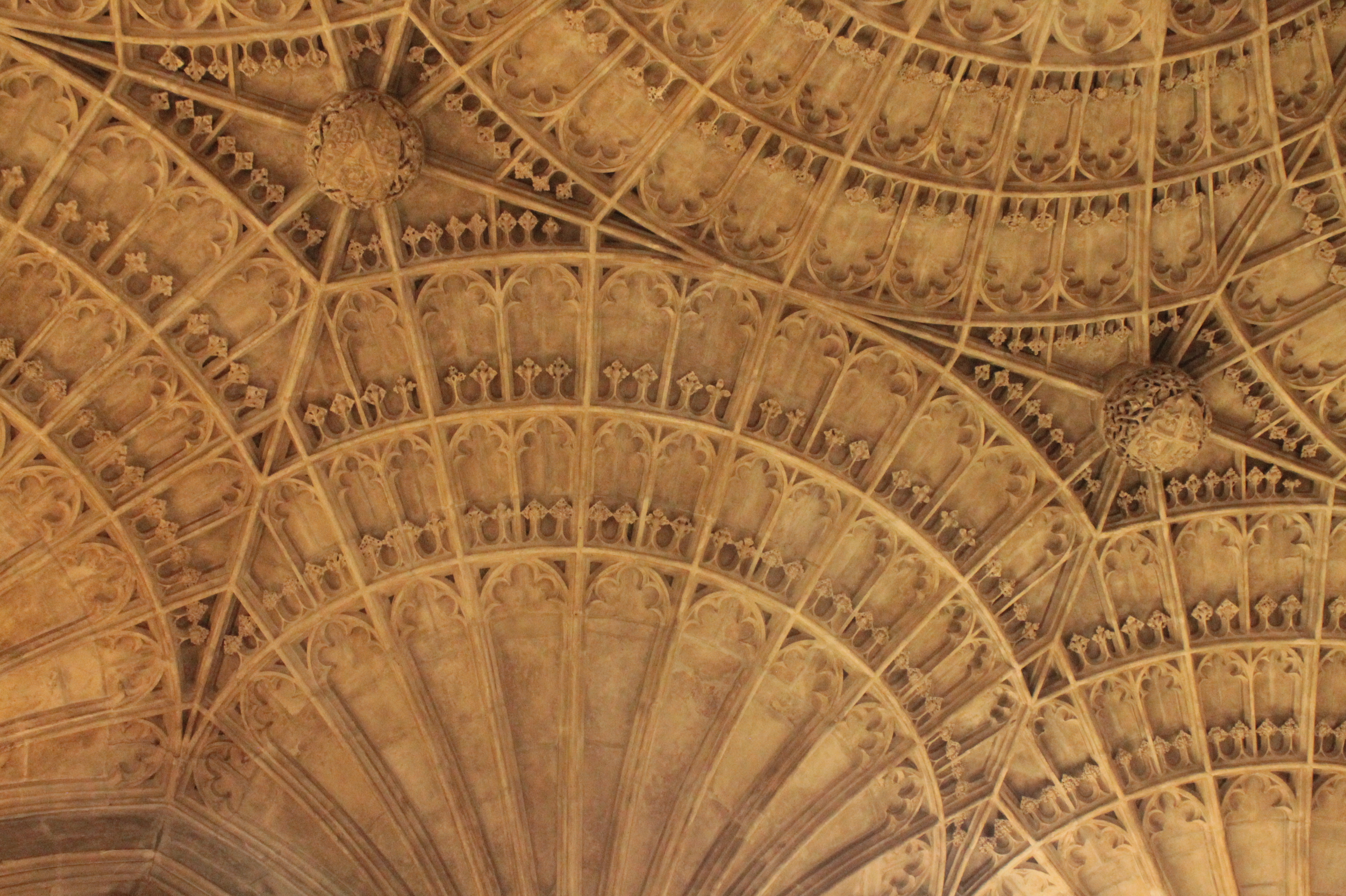
Fan vaulting showing the wealth of the abbey

These items underpinned the importance of what is today Peterborough Cathedral. At the zenith of its wealth just before the Reformation it had the sixth-largest monastic income in the country and was one of the most powerful communities in the English Benedictine Congregation. It had a 120 monks, including all the standard roles of a monastic community such as the almoner, the infirmarian, the sacristan and the cellarer, and many more dependant lay brothers and employees.

=== Tudor ===
In 1541, following Henry VIII's dissolution of the monasteries, the relics were lost. The church survived by being selected as the cathedral of the Anglican Diocese of Peterborough. The last Abbot of Peterborough, John Chambers, became the first Bishop of Peterborough. Henry's former wife, Catherine of Aragon, had been buried there in 1536. Her tomb was damaged in 1643 and restored in the 19th century. To this day, her grave is honoured by visitors who decorate it with flowers and pomegranates (her symbol). The gold letters at the site read "Katharine Queen of England", a title she was denied at the time of her death. A festival to commemorate the Queen is held yearly.

In 1587, the body of Mary, Queen of Scots was initially buried here after her execution at nearby Fotheringhay Castle, but it was later removed to Westminster Abbey on the orders of her son, King James VI of Scotland and James I of England.

=== Civil War to present ===
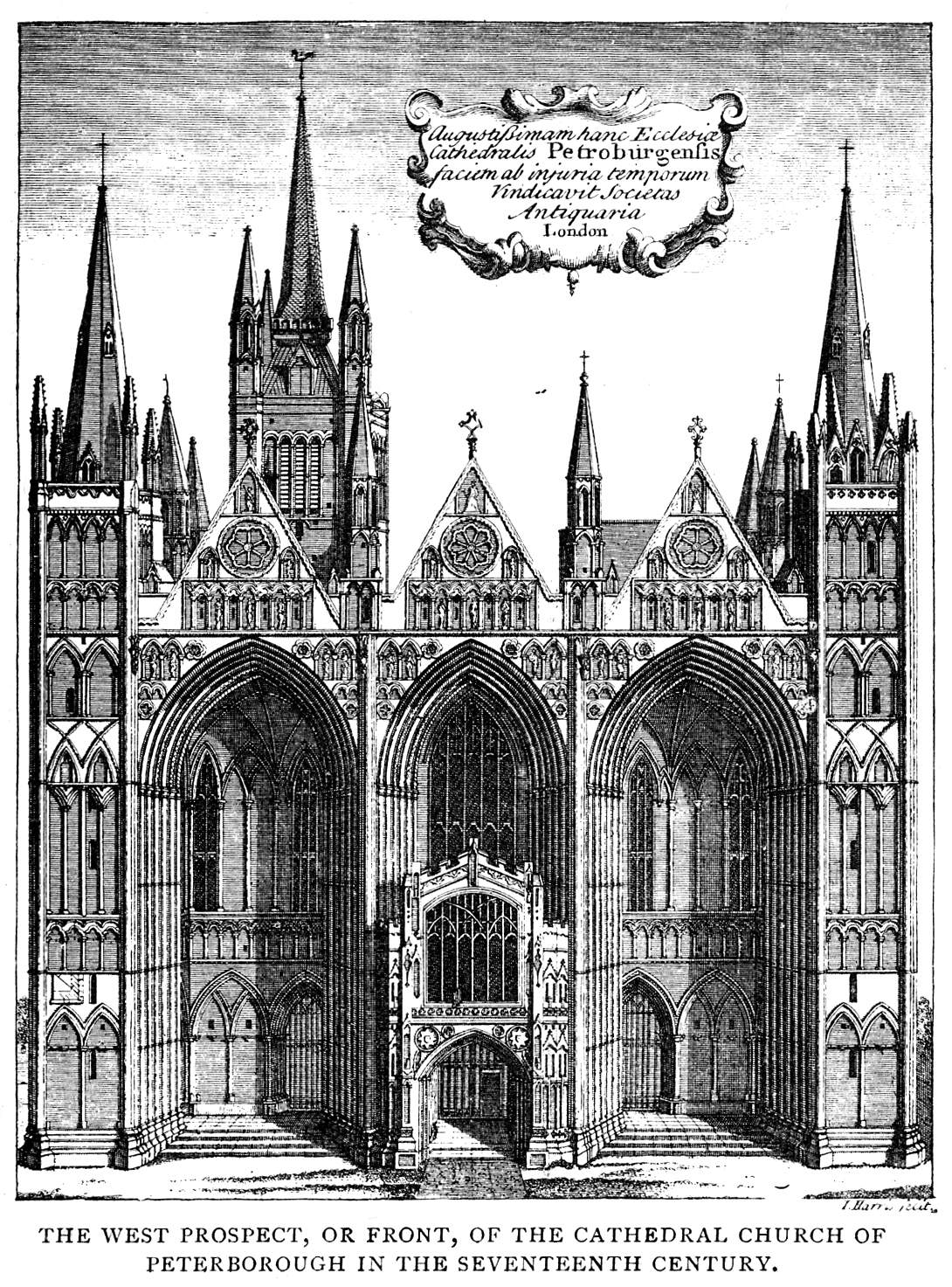
West prospect in the seventeenth century

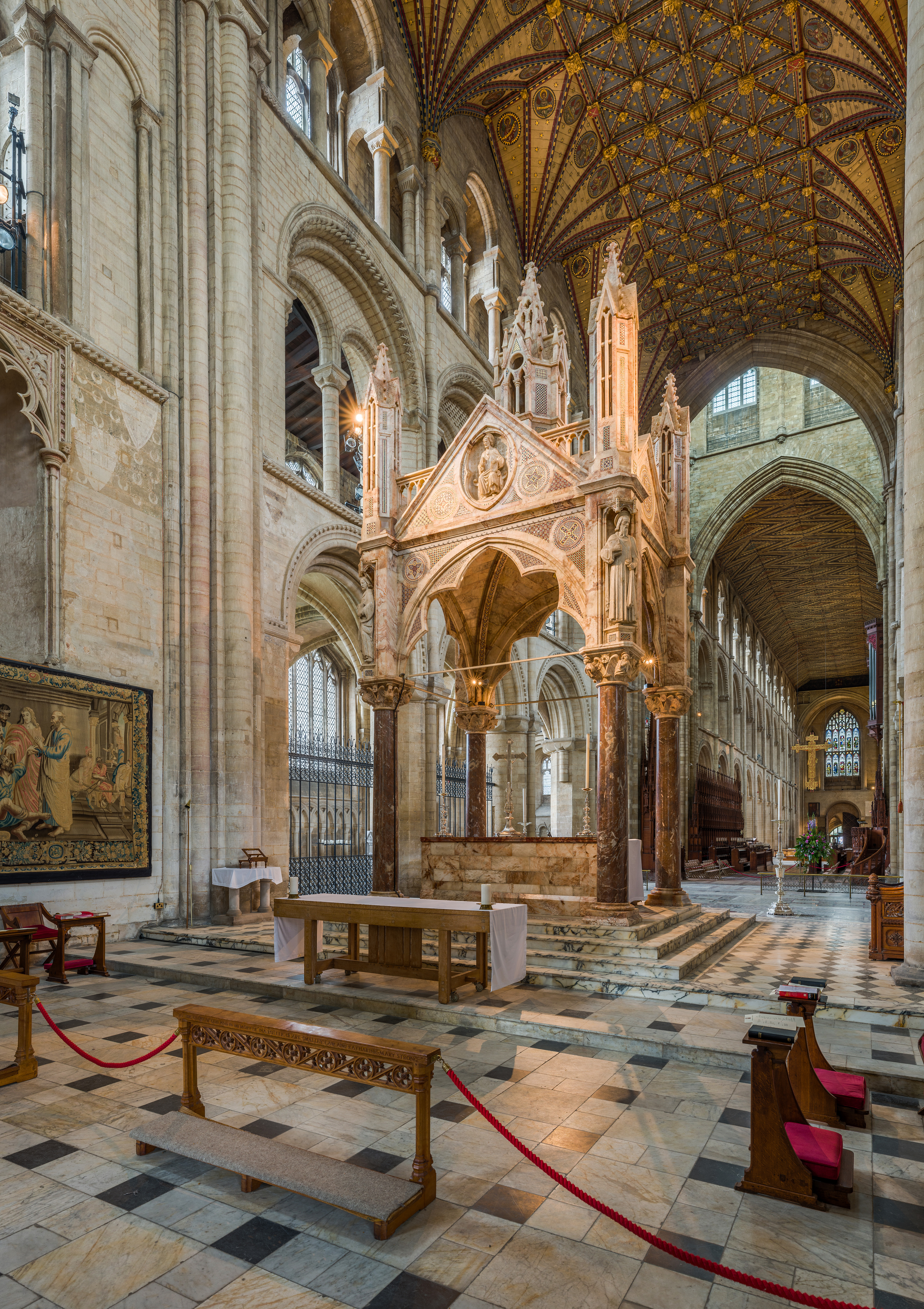
The high altar

The cathedral was vandalised during the English Civil War in 1643 by Parliamentarian troops. As was common at the time, almost all the stained glass and the medieval choir stalls were destroyed, and the high altar and reredos were demolished, as were the cloisters and Lady Chapel. All the monuments and memorials of the Cathedral were also damaged or destroyed.

Some of the damage was repaired during the 17th and 18th centuries. Extensive restoration work began in 1883, which was initiated after large cracks appeared in the supporting pillars and arches of the main tower. These works included rebuilding of the central tower and its foundations, interior pillars, the choir and re-enforcements of the west front under the supervision of John Loughborough Pearson. New hand-carved choir stalls, cathedra (bishop's throne), choir pulpit and the marble pavement and high altar were added. A stepped level of battlements was removed from the central tower, reducing its height slightly.

The cathedral was hit by a fire on the early evening of 22 November 2001; it is thought to have been started deliberately amongst plastic chairs stored in the North Choir Aisle. The fire was spotted by one of the vergers allowing a swift response by emergency services. The timing was particularly unfortunate, for a complete restoration of the painted wooden ceiling was nearing completion. The oily smoke given off by the plastic chairs was particularly damaging, coating much of the building with a sticky black layer. The seat of the fire was close to the organ and the combination of direct damage from the fire, and the water used to extinguish necessitated a full-scale rebuild of the instrument, putting it out of action for several years.

An extensive programme of repairs to the west front began in July 2006 and has cost in excess of half a million pounds. This work is concentrated around the statues located in niches which have been so badly affected by years of pollution and weathering that, in some cases, they have only stayed intact thanks to iron bars inserted through them from the head to the body. The programme of work has sought donors to "adopt a stone".

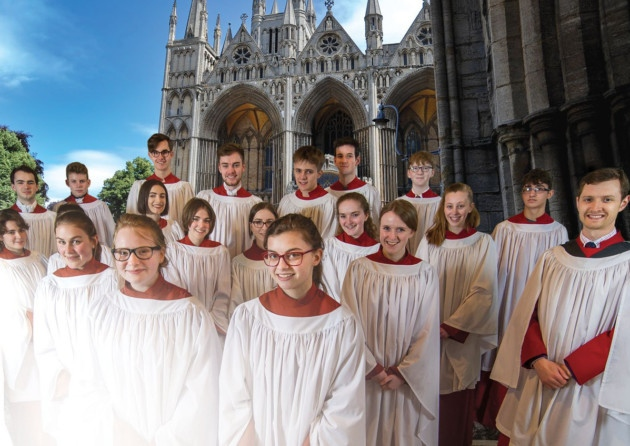
Peterborough Cathedral Youth Choir with conductor David Humphreys

The sculptor Alan Durst was responsible for some of the work on the statues on the West Front.

== Misericords ==
Peterborough Cathedral most probably had a set of over thirty misericords dating from the fourteenth century. However, only three now survive.

== Clock ==
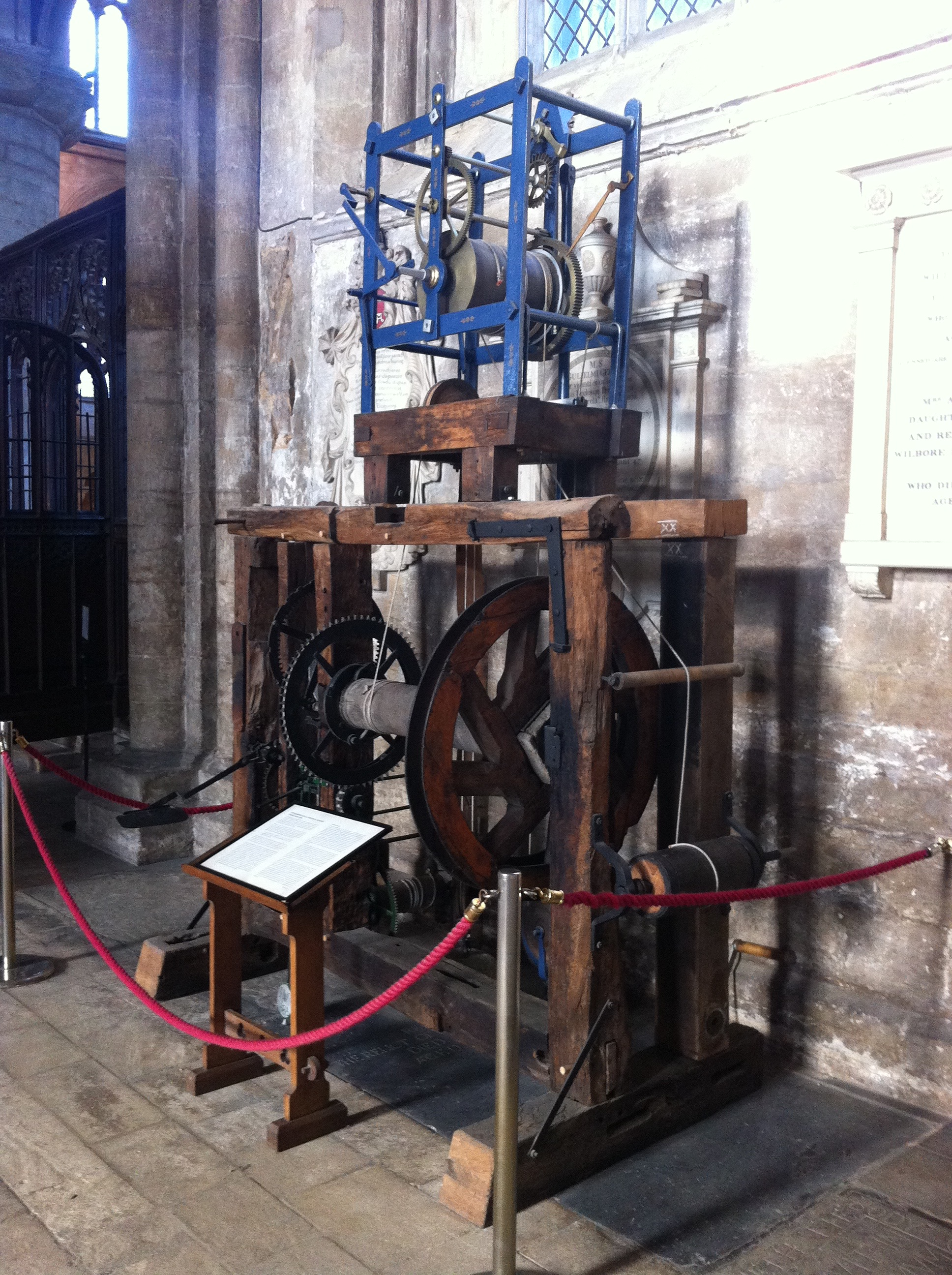
The old clock at Peterborough Cathedral

A wooden-framed striking clock in the Midlands tradition which required daily winding survived installed in the north-west tower until 1950. It contains parts from ca. 1400 to the 1830s. John Watts of Stamford 1687 upgraded the clock with the removal of the foliot and addition of a pendulum at a cost of £7 (equivalent to £1,400 in 2025). At this point the pendulum was about 6 feet (1.8 m) long with a beat of 1.2 seconds.

In 1836, John Wilson of Peterborough added a new metal-framed timekeeping movement. At this point the pendulum had a length of 10 feet (3.0 m) and beat 37 times per minute.

This mechanism was restored by Michael Lee in 1984 and in 1986 was put on display within the body of the cathedral.

The mechanical clock was replaced in 1950 by an electric installation at a cost of £220 (equivalent to £6,500 in 2025).

== Dean and chapter ==
As of 1 January 2022:

- Dean – Chris Dalliston (since 20 January 2018 installation)
- Vice Dean and Canon Pastor – Tim Alban Jones (since 2015; Acting Dean, 2017–2018; Acting Precentor, 2017–2018; Vice Dean since February 2018; Bishop's Chaplain {a Diocesan Canon}, 2015–2021; full-time since 1 January 2022)
- Canon Precentor – Rowan C. Williams (since 16 September 2018 installation)
- Canon Missioner and Bishop's Chaplain (Diocesan Canon) – Steve Benoy (1 May 2022 onwards)
- one Diocesan Canon vacancy – previously held by Ian Black, Vicar of Peterborough until his installation as Dean of Newport, 22 May 2021

== Burials ==
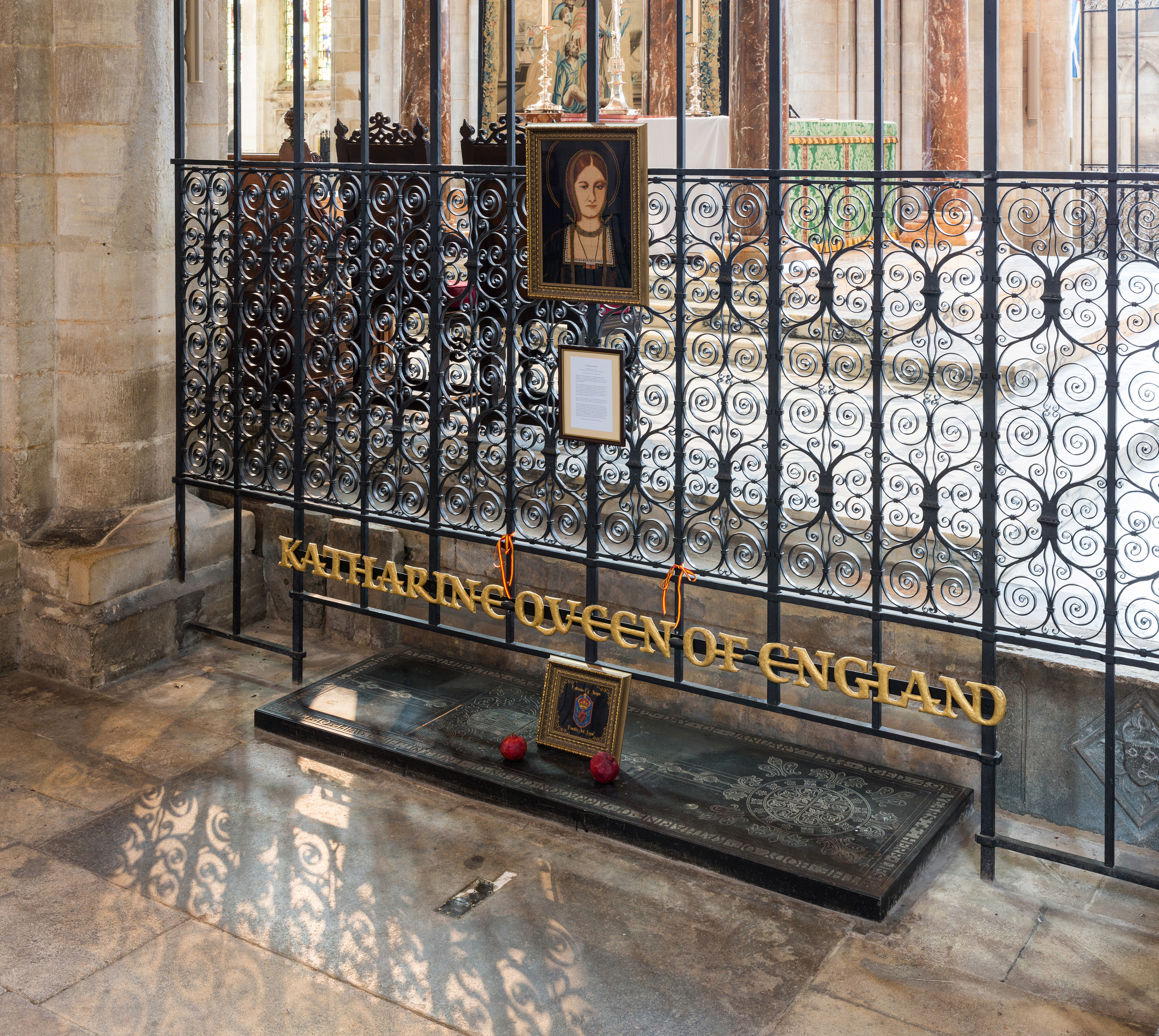
The grave of Catherine of Aragon (1485 – 1536), the first wife of Henry VIII. The gold lettering is modern.

- Kyneburga, Kyneswide and Tibba: Kyneburga and Kyneswide were sisters (daughters of King Penda of Mercia). Kyneburga (d. c. 680) founded an Abbey for both monks and nuns in Castor, becoming the first Abbess (Kyneswide succeeded her). Kyneburga was buried in her church, but both of their remains were later translated (before 972) to Peterborough Abbey, now Peterborough Cathedral, along with those of their kinswoman, Tibba. Kyneburga became revered as a saint soon after her death. Her remains were moved once more to Thorney Abbey some time later. All three women are considered Saints.
- Ælfric Puttoc (died 1051), medieval Archbishop of York and Bishop of Worcester
- Ralph the Timid (died 1057), Earl of Hereford and nephew of Edward the Confessor
- Cynesige, Archbishop of York (1051–1060)
- Ralph the Staller (c. 1011 – c. 1068), (in the Abbey)
- Alexander of Holderness, 12th century Abbot of Peterborough
- Catherine of Aragon (1485–1536), Queen of England, first wife and queen-consort of Henry VIII
- Mary, Queen of Scots (1542–1587), following execution at nearby Fotheringhay Castle, was buried in Peterborough between 1587 and 1612, before being disinterred and reinterred in Westminster Abbey
- John Chambers, first Bishop of Peterborough (1541–1556)
- Robert Scarlett ("Old Scarlett") (1496–1594), sexton of Peterborough Cathedral, who dug graves for both Catherine of Aragon and Mary, Queen of Scots, during many years of service (just inside the Cathedral)
- Richard Howland, Bishop of Peterborough (1584–1600)
- Francis Dee, Bishop of Peterborough (1634–1638)
- John Towers, Bishop of Peterborough (1639–1649)
- Richard Cumberland (philosopher), Bishop of Peterborough (1691–1718)
- John Hinchliffe, Bishop of Peterborough (1769–1794)
- Spencer Madan, Bishop of Bristol and Bishop of Peterborough (1729–1813)
- William Connor Magee, Bishop of Peterborough and Archbishop of York (1821–1891)
- Rev Lewis Clayton, bishop suffragan of Leicester (1838–1917)

=== Other Memorials ===
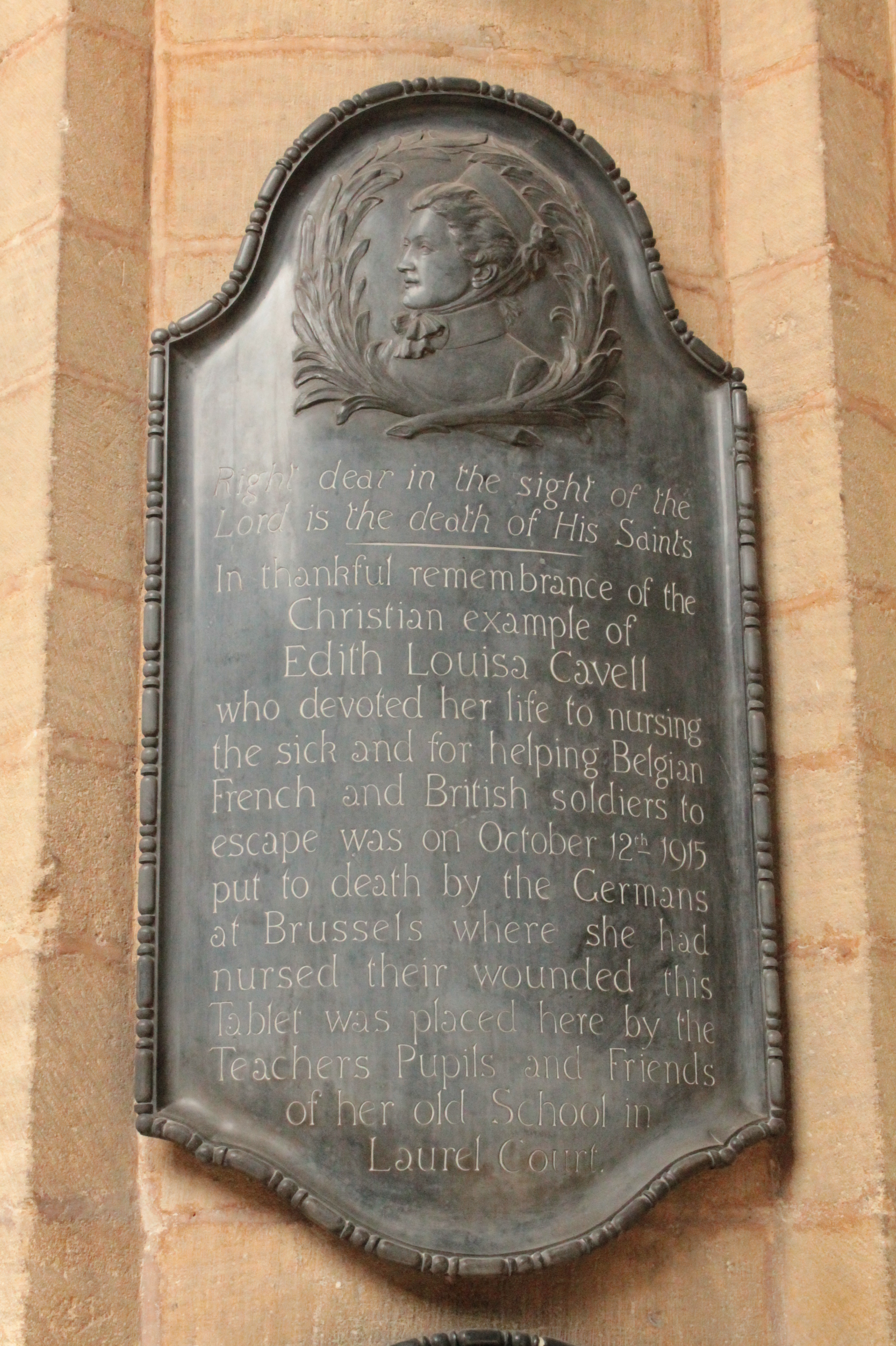
Memorial to Edith Cavell, Peterborough Cathedral by Mahomet Thomas Phillips

- George Alcock (1912–2000), astronomer
- Edith Cavell, nurse executed by the Germans
- William Clavell Ingram, Dean of Peterborough
- Francis Jeune (1806–1868), Bishop of Peterborough
- William Latymer, Dean of Peterborough
- Bishop Spencer Leeson (window)
- John P. Saunders (1907–1928), colonial police officer assassinated by Indian revolutionaries in Lahore
- Arthur Richard Sculthorpe (1903–1974), campaigner for the deaf-blind
- Bill Westwood (1925–1999), Bishop of Peterborough
- Sgt Thomas Hunter of Kurri Kurri, New South Wales

=== Reliquary at Peterborough ===
A number of saints were interred in the altar at Peterborough Wilfrid, Tatberht, Sicgrid nicknamed Pius Pater, Botwine reverndus sacerdos, Albert praeclarus minister, Wulfgar and Wildegel modestus.

== Gallery ==
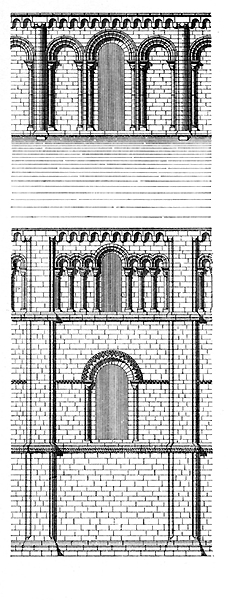
Partial elevation

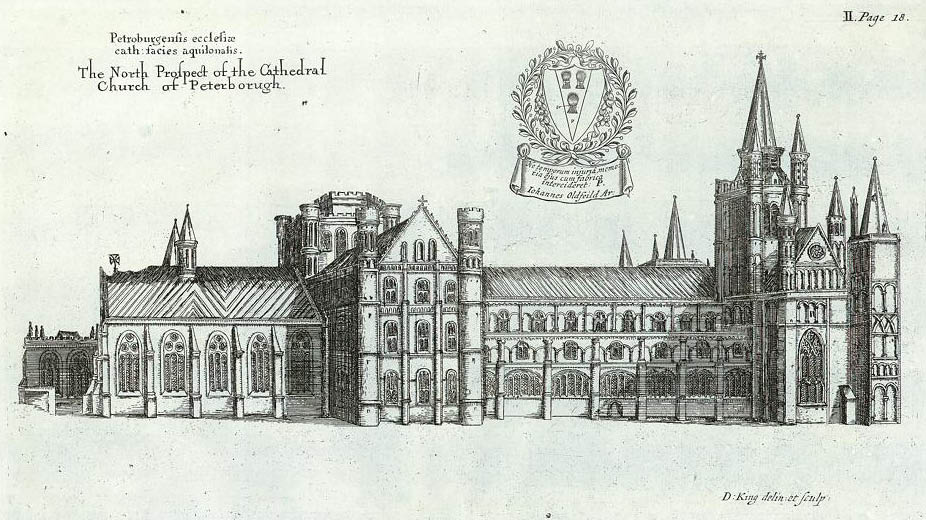
17th-century view

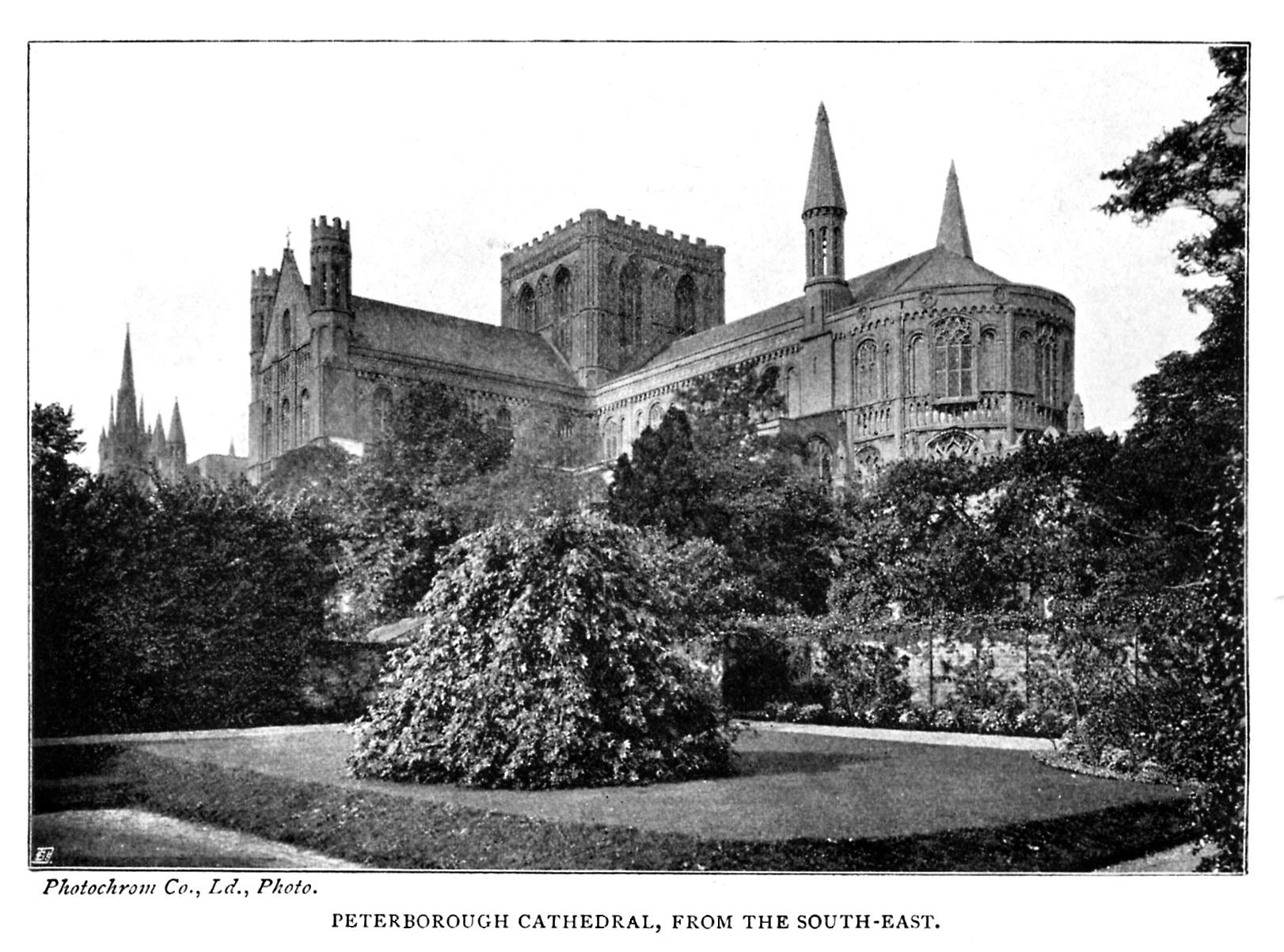
View from the south east, c. 1898, after the 1880s rebuilding

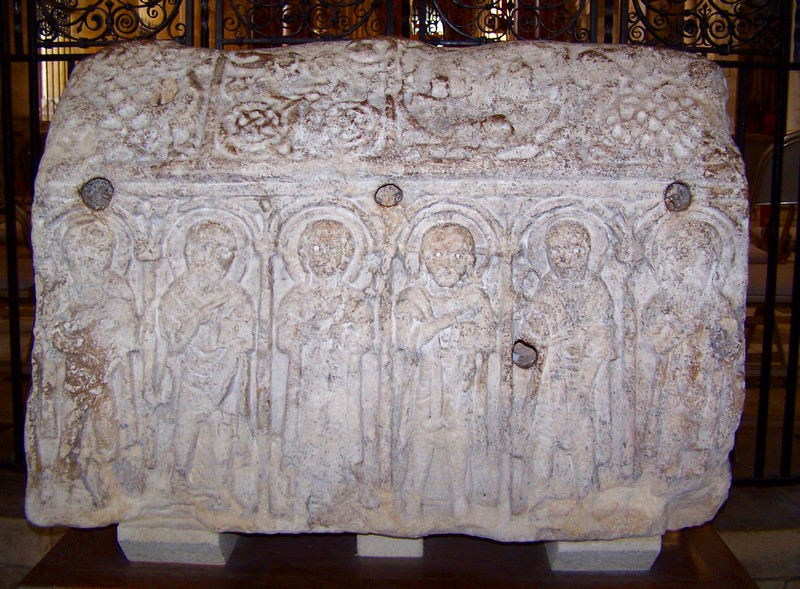
The Hedda Stone. An 8th-century Anglo-Saxon carving from the original church.

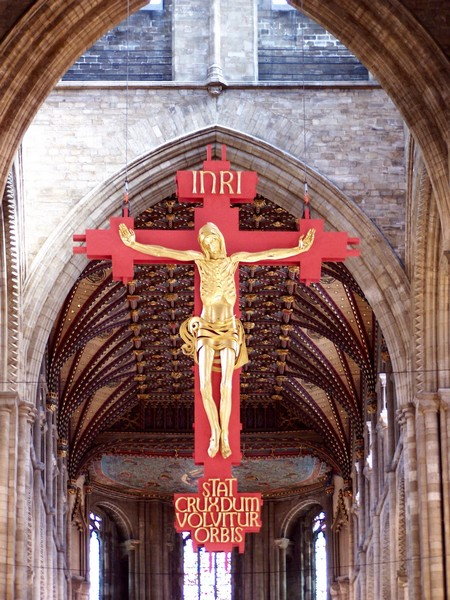
The hanging crucifix or rood designed by George Pace in 1975, the figure of Christ is by Frank Roper.

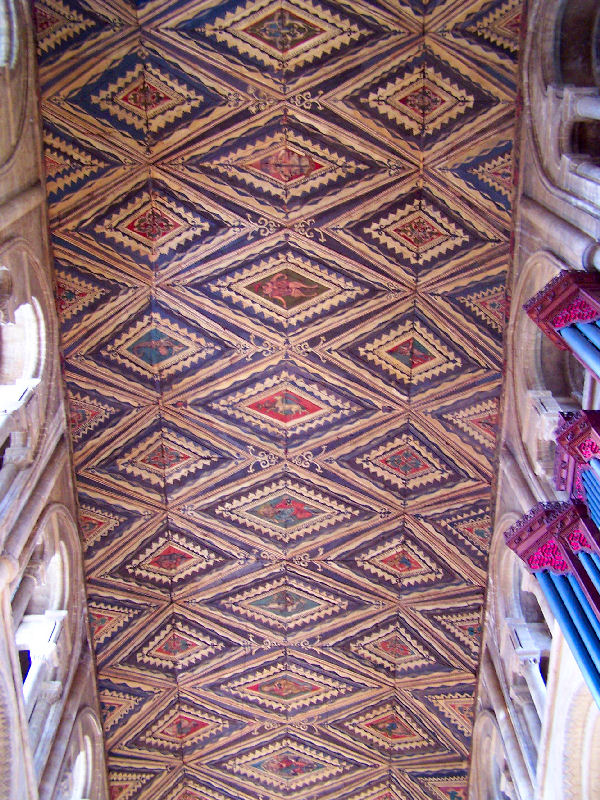
Painted nave ceiling.

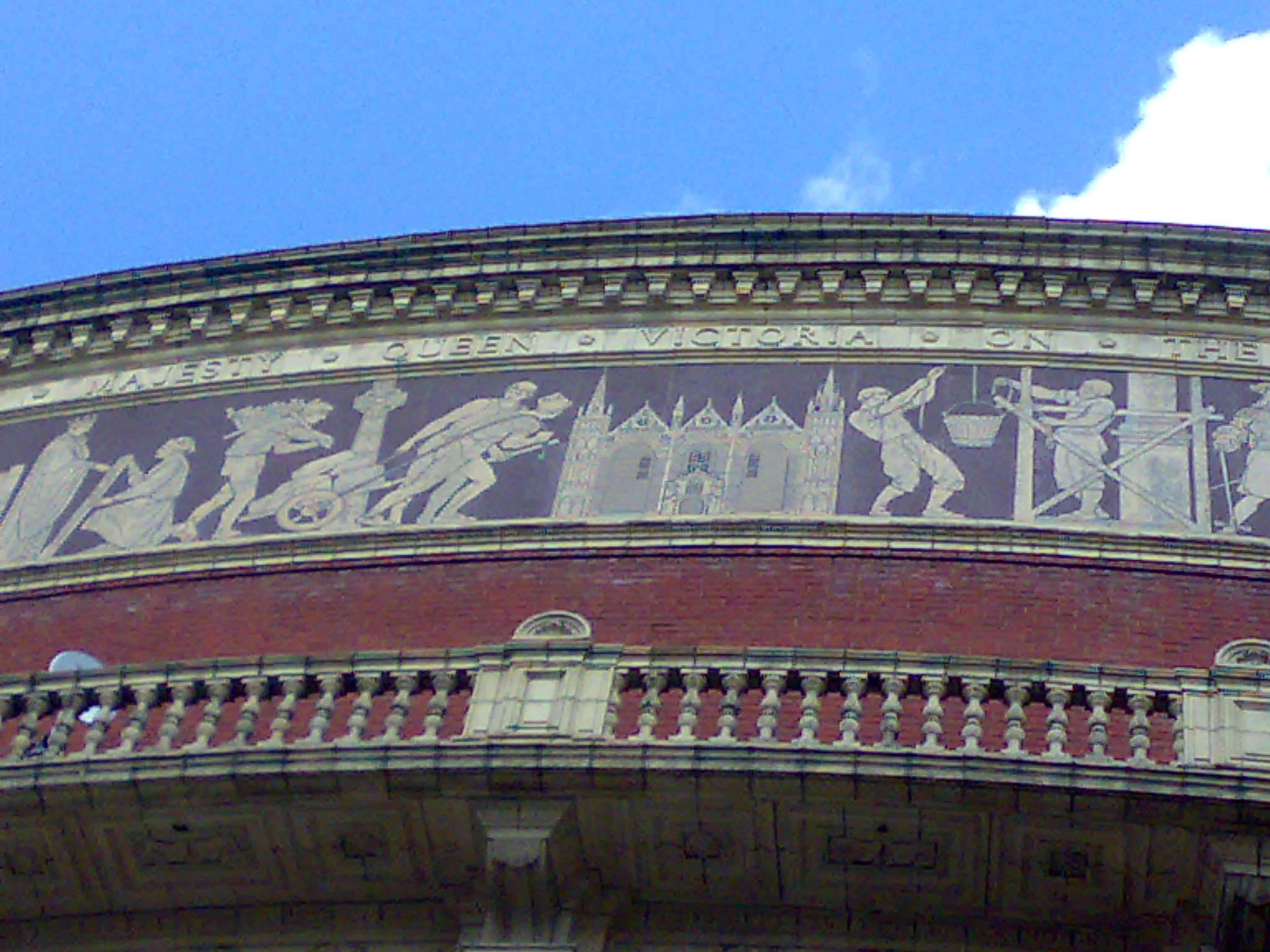
The cathedral as represented on the frieze around the Royal Albert Hall

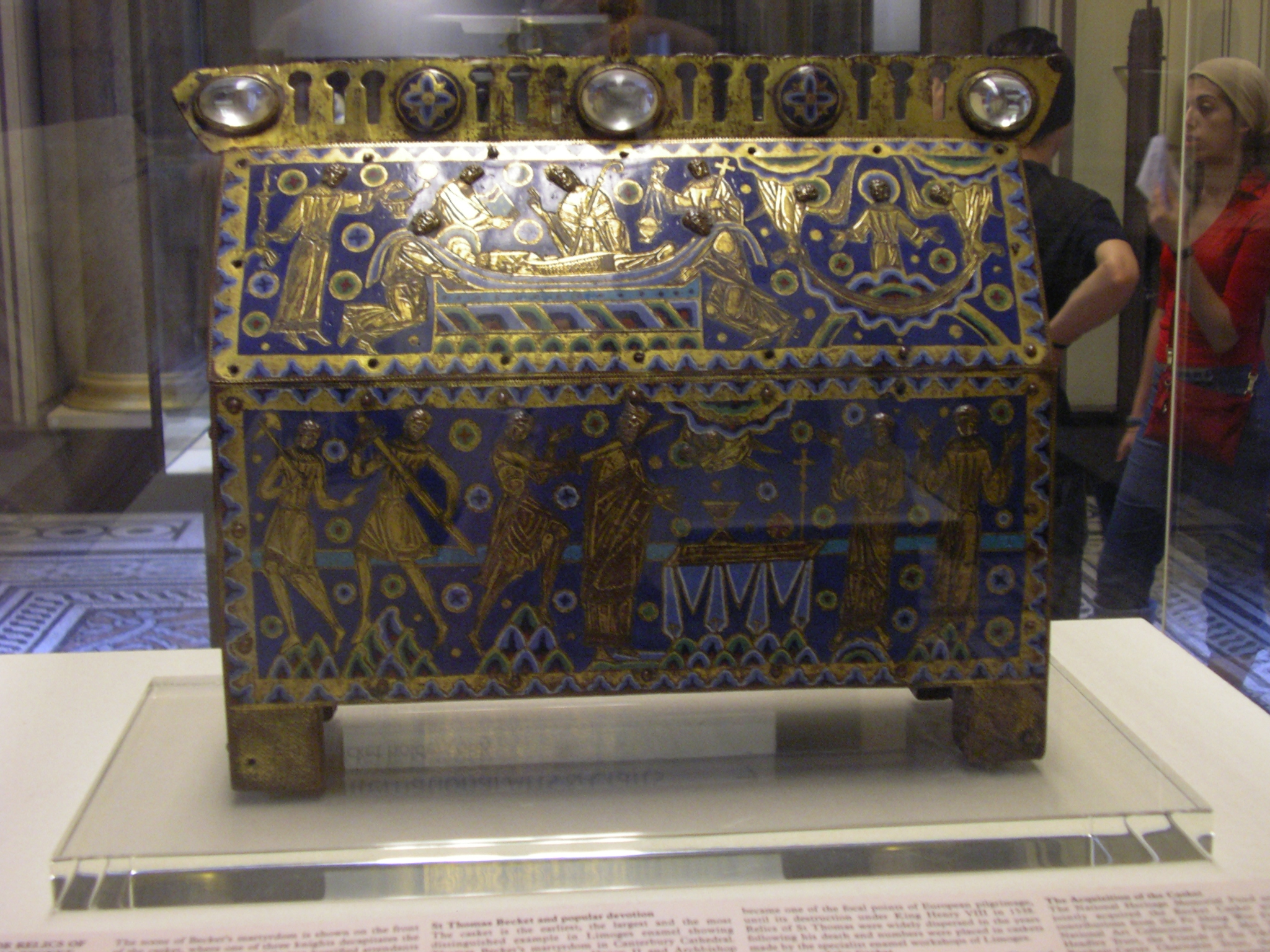
French enamelled casket made c. 1180 for Benedict to take some relics of Thomas Becket to Peterborough Abbey when he became its Abbot. As Prior of Canterbury Cathedral he had witnessed Becket's assassination in 1170. The casket is now in the Victoria and Albert Museum, London. In 2018, it was on temporary display in Peterborough Museum to celebrate the 900th anniversary of the completion of the Cathedral in 1118.

== Cathedral music ==
=== Organ ===
The Organ

=== Organists ===
The records of organists at Peterborough Cathedral list Richard Storey as organist in 1540. Notable organists of Peterborough Cathedral have included Stanley Vann, Sir Malcolm Sargent and Sir Thomas Armstrong.

== Lists of incumbents ==
- List of bishops of Peterborough
- List of deans of Peterborough
- List of abbots of Peterborough

== See also ==
- List of Gothic cathedrals in Europe
- List of cathedrals in the United Kingdom
- Peterborough Chronicle
- The King's School, Peterborough
- Architecture of the medieval cathedrals of England
- English Gothic architecture
- Romanesque architecture
- Church of England
- List of ecclesiastical restorations and alterations by J. L. Pearson
