= Tatberht =

8th-century abbot of Ripon, North Yorkshire

Tatberht was an eighth century Anglo-Saxon saint, abbot and contemporary of Bede.

== Provenance ==
He is known to history through the writing of Bede, the Secgan Hagiography, Stephen of Ripon, Hugh Candidus and Byrhtferth.

== Life ==
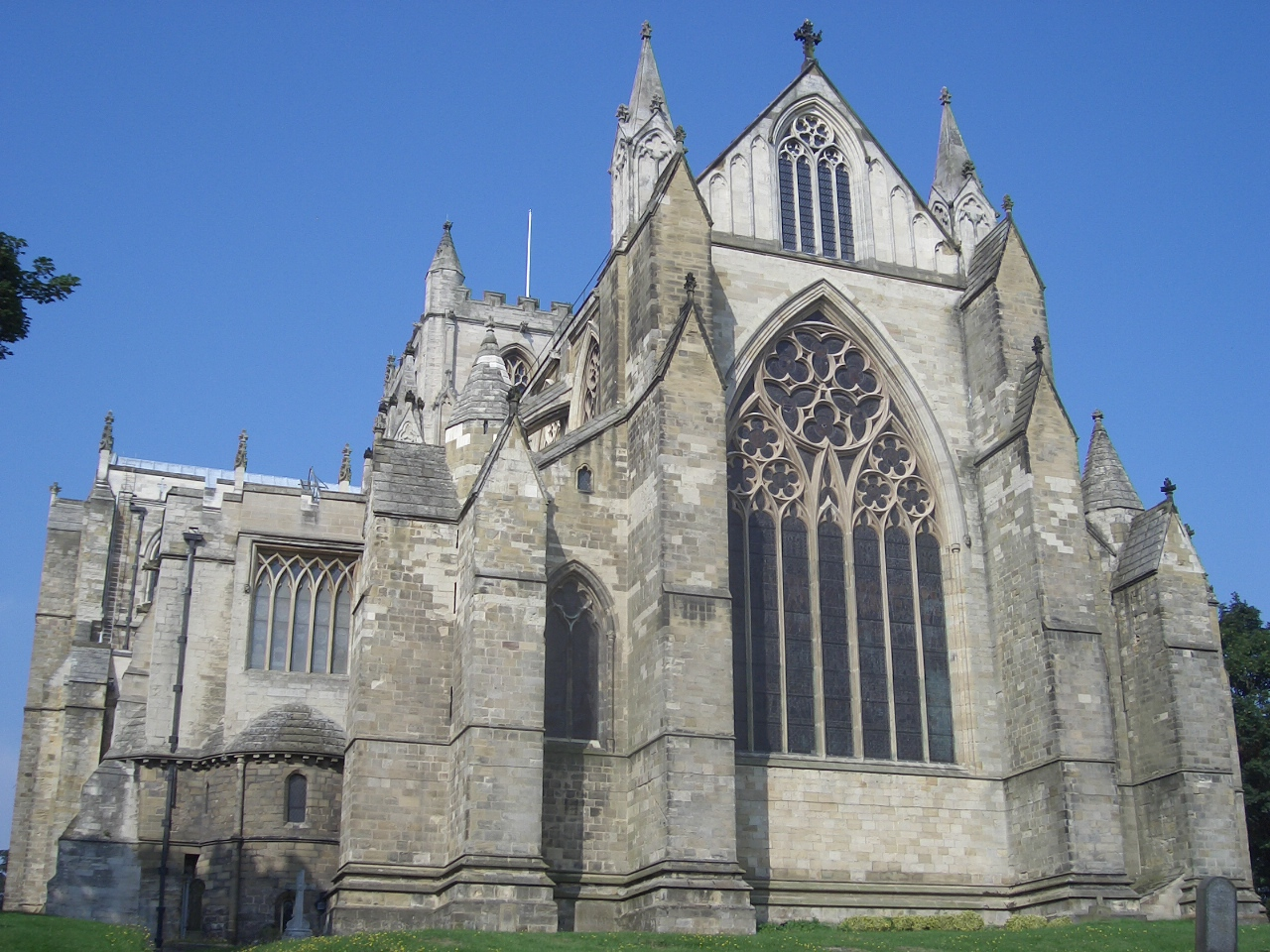
The western façade of Ripon Cathedral

Tatberht was appointed the second Abbot of Ripon, in accord with the terms of the will of the Abbeys founder Wilfrid, who was notable for arguing the Roman position at the Synod of Whitby.

A relative of his predecessor Wilfred, with whom he worked closely, Tatberht, was named in Wilfrid's will as joint heir with Saint Acca the patron of Bede. Tatberht and Acca commissioned Stephen of Ripon to write a life of Wilfrid.

== Veneration ==
According to Hugh Candidus and Byrhtferth he is buried at Ripon, along with Saints Wilfrid, ’Albert’, Botwine and Sicgred and ’Wildegel’, while there is evidence he was re-interred in Peterborough Abbey. and he is commemorated on 5 June.
