= Beornstan the Archdeacon =

Medieval Anglo Saxon Catholic saint

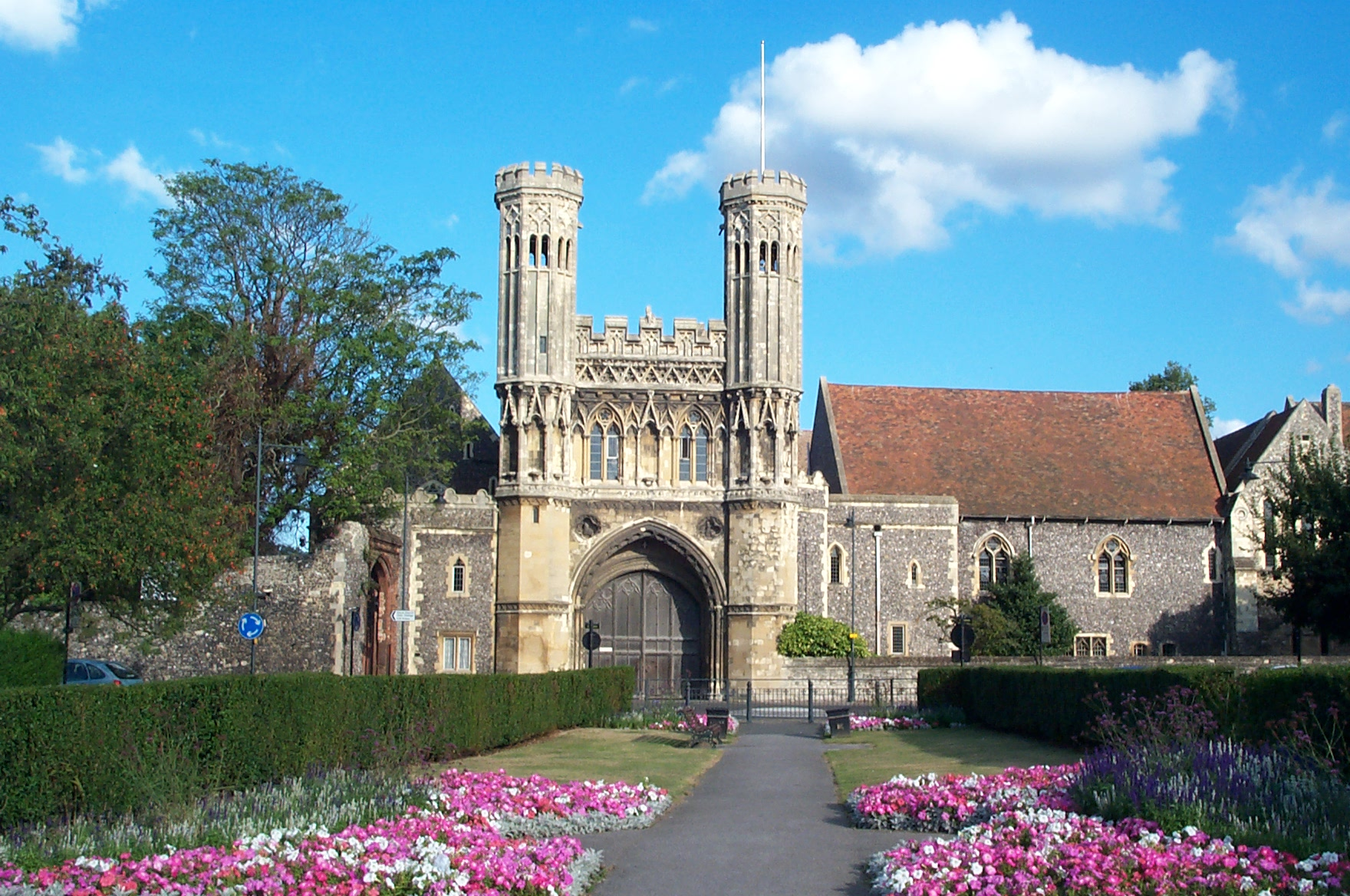
- St Augustines Abbey where Beornstan is buried.

Archdeacon
- Born: Kent, Anglo-Saxon England
- Died: St. Augustine's Abbey
- Venerated in: Catholic Church

Beornstan the Archdeacon, also known as Byrnstan, was a medieval Catholic saint from Kent in Anglo-Saxon England.

Very little is known of the life of this saint and he is known to history mainly through the hagiography of the Secgan Manuscript and also The Catalogus Sanctorum in Anglia Pausantium. He was Kentish, an archdeacon and was buried at St Augustine's Abbey, indicating a possible association with the early Abbey.
