= Æthelwynn =

English tapestry embroiderer

Æthelwynn, often spelled Ethylwynn, Ethylwyn, or Ethelwynn (10th-century) was an English noblewoman and textile artist. She was known for her embroidery work and her miraculous encounter with Saint Dunstan.

According to Saint Dunstan's biographer, Æthelwynn asked Saint Dunstan to help her design a stole, intended for religious use, that had various figured patterns, and which she planned to later decorate with gold and precious stones. The stole embellished by Æthelwynn has since vanished.

When Saint Dunstan went to visit Æthelwynn and he took his lyre (which has also been described as a harp) with him, in order to play it when they rested from work. According to legend, he hung the lyre on the wall and it played by itself; upon hearing this, Dunstan, Æthelwynn, and all her work women who were present, "were seized with dread and, altogether forgetful of the work in their hands, they stared at each other in amazement.”
