= Barloc of Norbury =

Anglo-Saxon Christian saint

Saint Barloc of Norbury
- Honored in: Roman Catholic Church, Anglican Communion
- Major shrine: St Mary and St Barlock's Church, Norbury
- Feast: 10 October

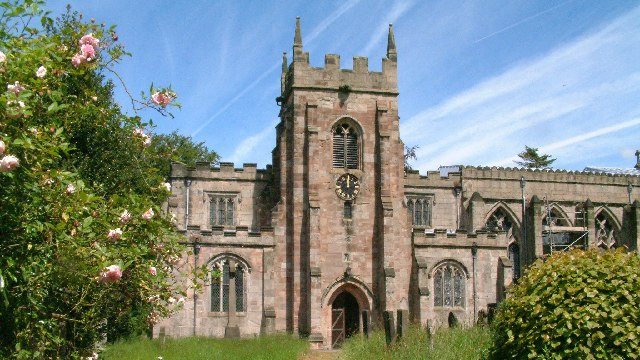
St Mary and St Barlock's Church, Norbury

Barloc of Norbury was a medieval Catholic saint and hermit, from Anglo-Saxon England.

Very little is known of the life of this saint. Barloc's name indicates he might have been Celtic. He is known to history mainly through the hagiography of the Secgan Manuscript; he also occurs in a litany in MS Tanner 169* of the Bodleian Library, Oxford.

Saint Barlock has been identified with Finbarr of Cork. Around 1179, John Fitzherbert, 3rd Lord of Norbury, built a church in Norbury dedicated to St Barlacus. (Fitzherbert had previously been Governor of Waterford.s This church replaced a previous Anglo-Saxon one, which may also have been named for Barlock. Historian John Blair suggests a connection between the name Barlock and the Welsh "Barrog".

The name also appears as Saint Barlok in a 1491 charter.

Barloc was venerated at St Werburgh's, Chester and his feast day is on 10 September.
