= Elfin of Warrington =

Medieval Christian saint

Elfin of Warrington is a little-known saint venerated in medieval Warrington, near the modern city of Liverpool. He is known only from one entry in the Domesday Book, his cult or church holding one carucate of land. The name may be Brittonic, derived from Latin Alpinus, or could be a diminutive of an Old English name beginning Ælf.
