= Eadmund the Confessor =

Eadmund the Confessor is a pre-Congregational saint of Anglo-Saxon England.

He is known only from the litany from Lambeth Palace MS 427, a 15th-century addition to a psalter of the 11th century.
