= Bonneval Abbey (Eure-et-Loir) =

Abbey in Eure-et-Loir, France

- St. Florentinus' Abbey
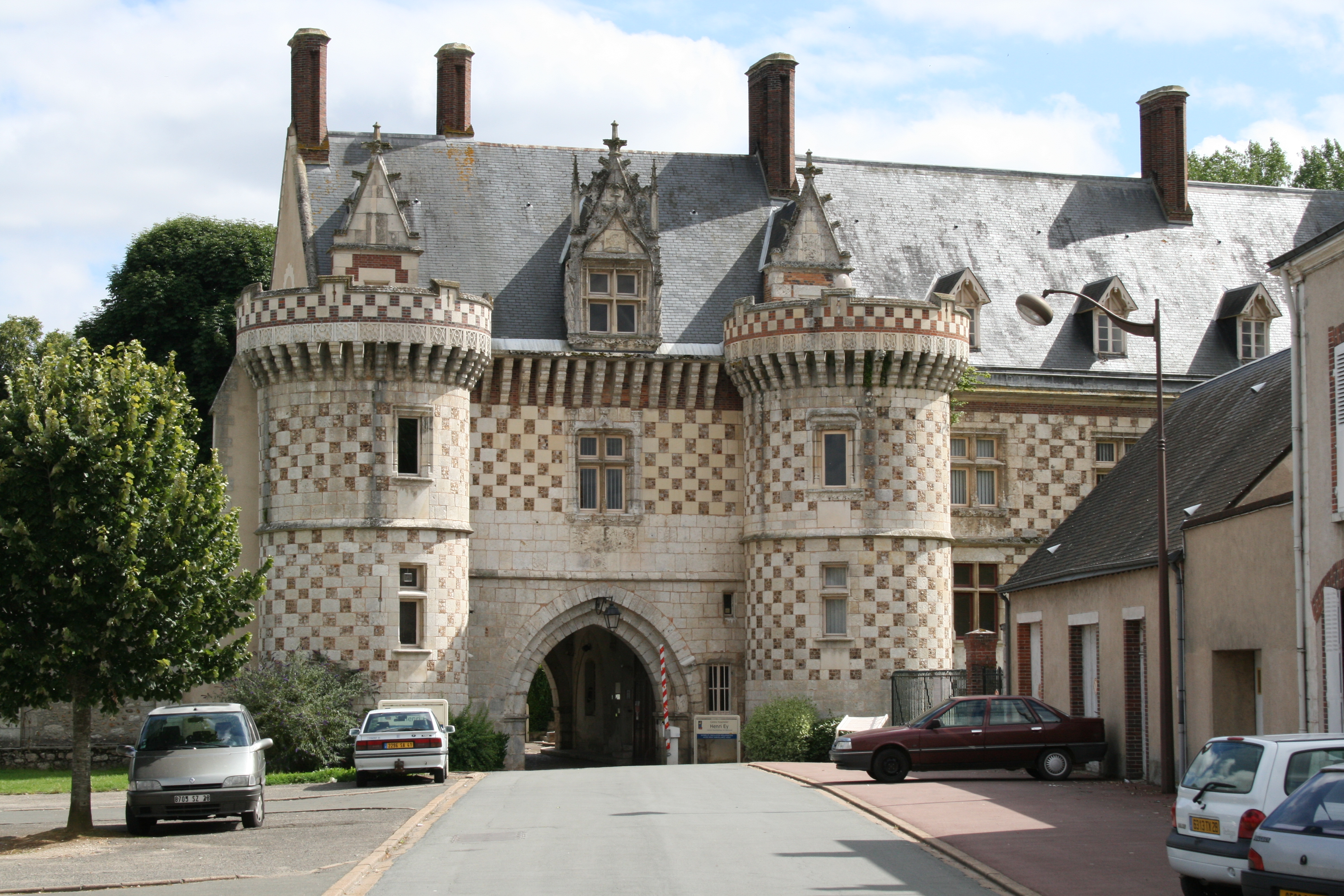
- Entrance to the former Bonneval Abbey, or St. Florentinus' Abbey, now a psychiatric hospital

- Location within France

Monastery information
- Order: Order of Saint Benedict
- Established: 857
- Diocese: Roman Catholic Diocese of Chartres

Architecture
- Heritage designation: Monument historique
- Designated date: 1883

Site
- Location: France
- Coordinates: 48°10′43″N 1°23′17″E

Bonneval Abbey, also known as St. Florentinus' Abbey (French: Abbaye de Bonneval, Abbaye St-Florentin de Bonneval or Abbaye St-Florentin et St-Hilaire de Bonneval), is a former Benedictine monastery in Bonneval, Eure-et-Loir, in France.

== History ==
The Benedictine abbey at Bonneval was founded in 857 by a knight called Foulques under the auspices of Charles of Provence, great-grandson of Charlemagne. (The town of the same name subsequently grew up around the monastery).

Originally dedicated to the Roman martyrs Saints Marcellinus and Peter, the abbey took the name of Florentinus after the transfer here of relics of the more local Saints Florentinus and Hilarius, martyred in Burgundy, in thanks for services rendered by the monks of Bonneval to abbot Aurelian of Ainay Abbey. During the monks' return trip from Roanne to Orléans so many miracles occurred and the saints became so popular that the abbey was known from then on by their names, and later by that of Florentinus only.

In 911, Bonneval Abbey was attacked by invading Normans and burnt down. It was not until 50 years later that it was rebuilt, with the support of Eudes, son of Thibaut the Cheat (Thibaut le Tricheur).

In 1110, Louis VI, King of France, took the abbey under royal protection for political reasons. The 12th and 13th centuries were the high period of Bonneval Abbey.

The Hundred Years' War had a very damaging effect on the monastery. In 1420, Henry V, King of England, attacked it and once again it was pillaged and burnt down. It was not rebuilt until the end of the 15th century, under René d’Illiers, Bishop of Chartres, who among other things rebuilt the abbots' lodging over the sub-basements of the 13th century.

In 1568, the Grand Condé, at the head of the Protestants, attacked the abbey, which was largely burnt down again.

At the French Revolution the abbey's property and premises were declared a national asset and the remaining buildings sold to a businessman who installed a thread-making factory and later a carpet factory.

In 1845, it was turned into an agricultural settlement for abandoned children, and in 1861, the lunatic asylum of the department of Eure-et-Loir.

In 1883, the abbey is designated by the French government as a protected monument historique (national heritage site).

The abbots' lodging was restored at the end of the 19th century to its original Early Renaissance style under the leadership of the director, Dr Vincent Bigot.

The abbey buildings now accommodate a psychiatric hospital, the Centre Hospitalier Henry Ey, named for the distinguished psychiatrist Henry Ey (1900–1977), who was its director for many years.

Two large pictures formerly in the monastery refectory are now in the parish church of Notre-Dame in Bonneval, depicting the miracle of the loaves and the fishes, and Jesus healing Simon the Leper, a copy of an original by Nicolas Poussin.

== Gallery ==
The old abbey Saint-Florentin-et-Saint-Hilaire

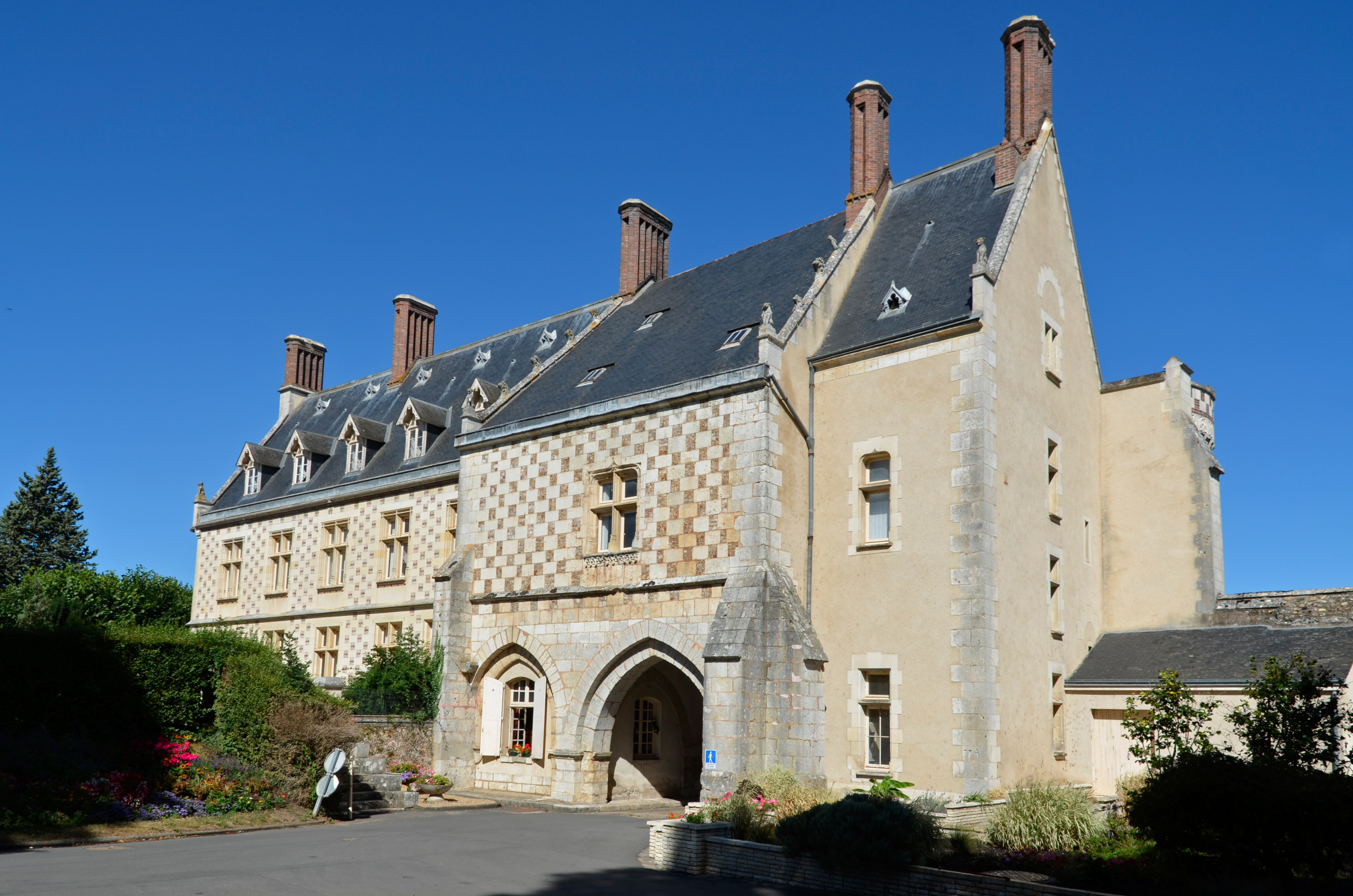

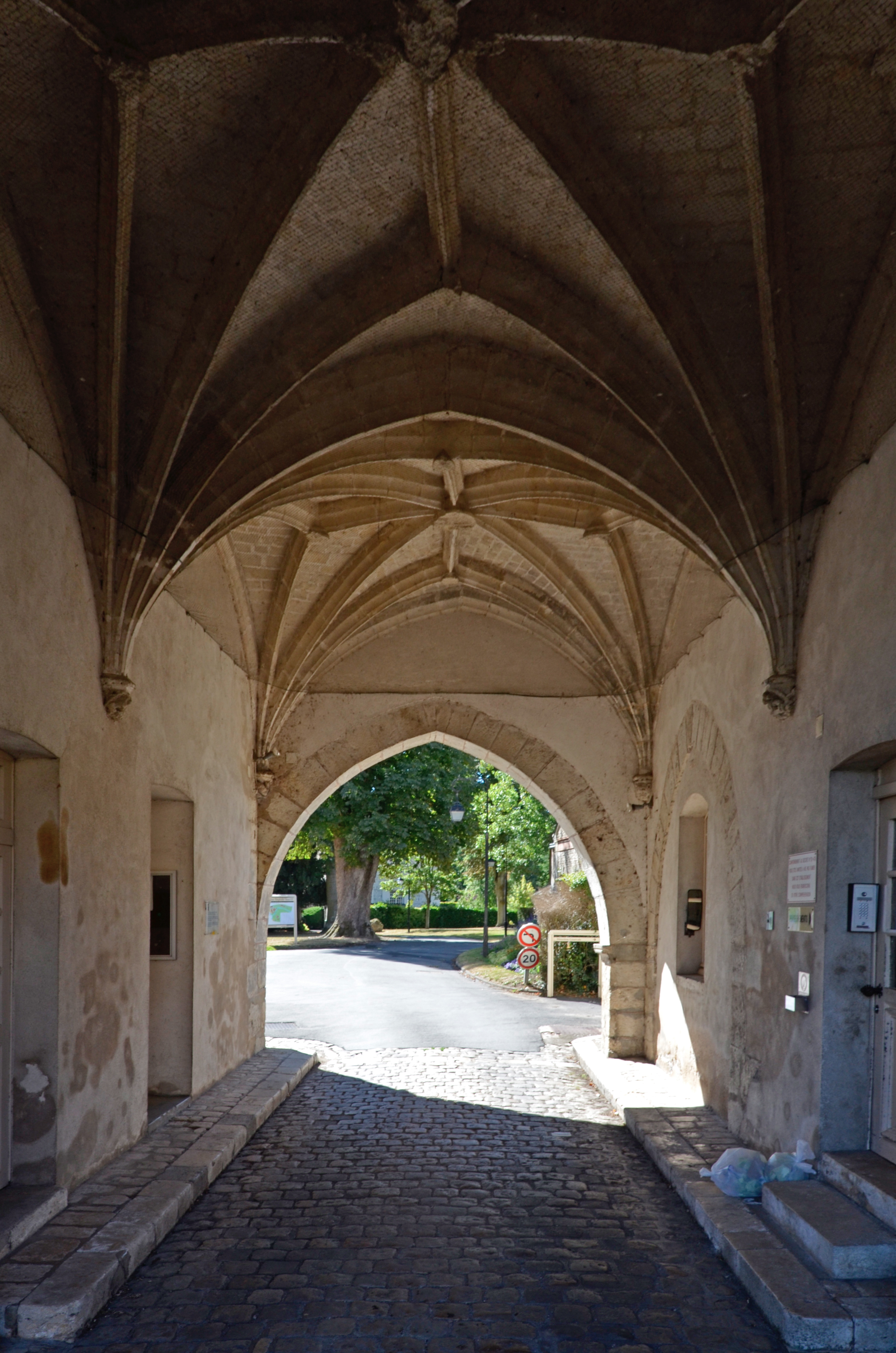

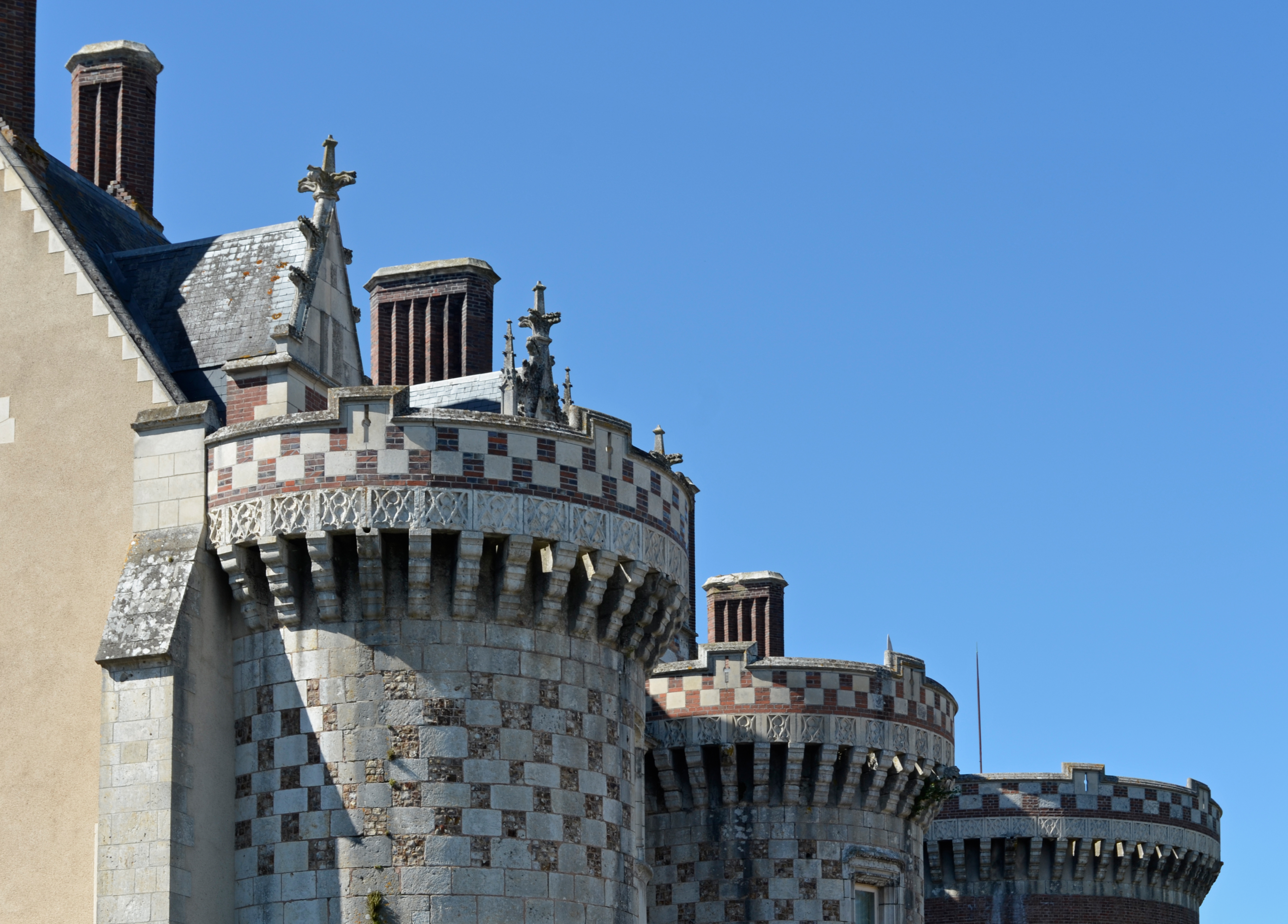

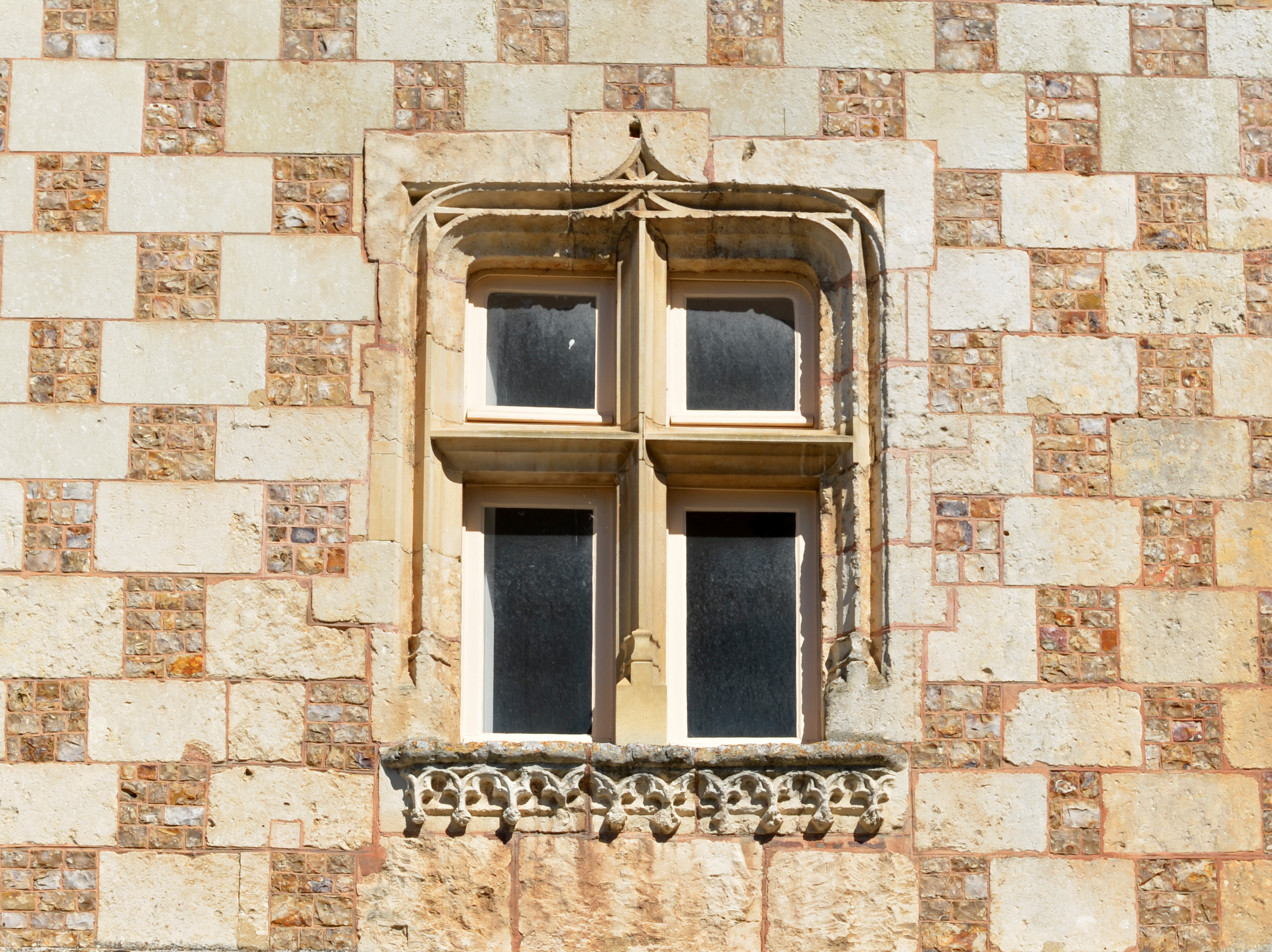

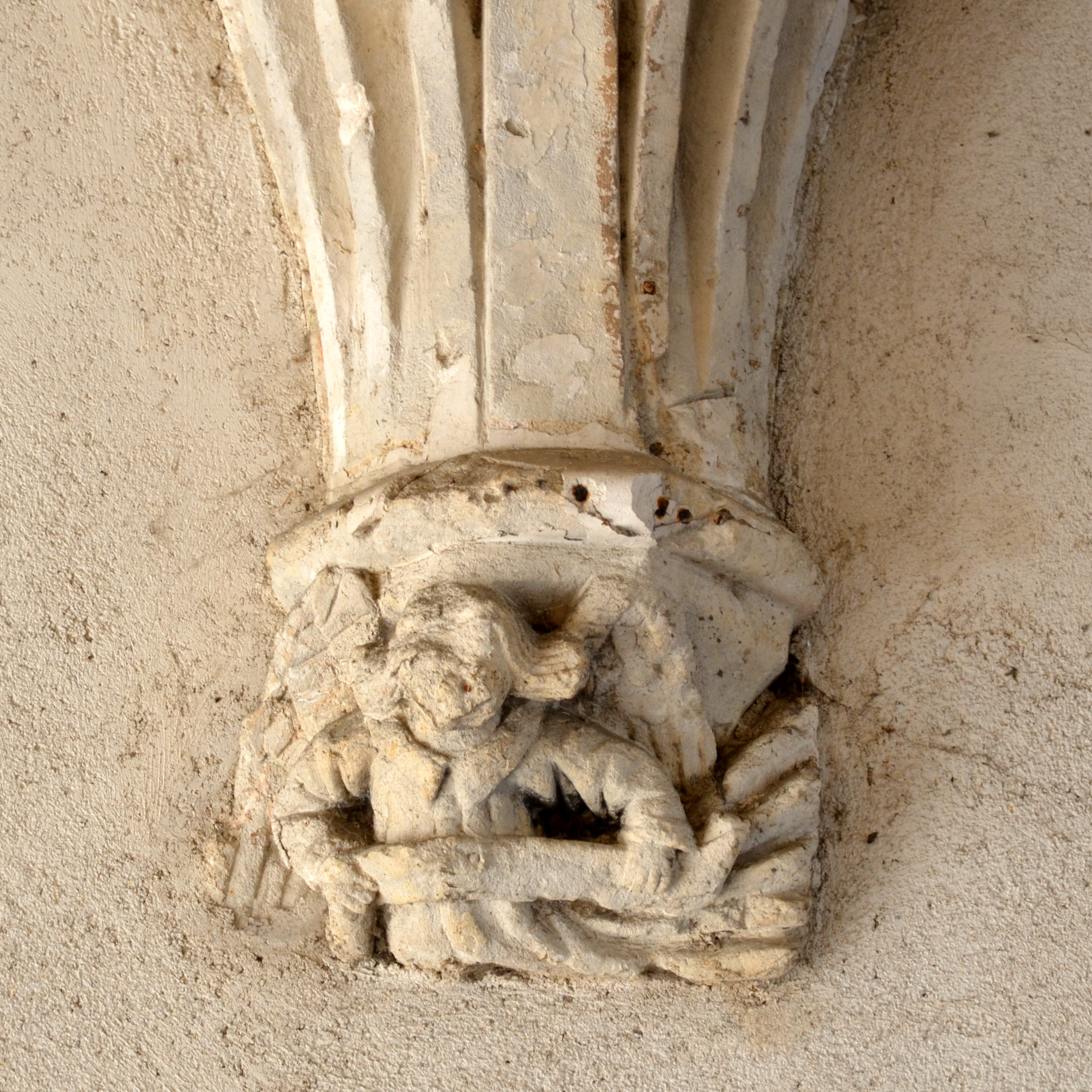

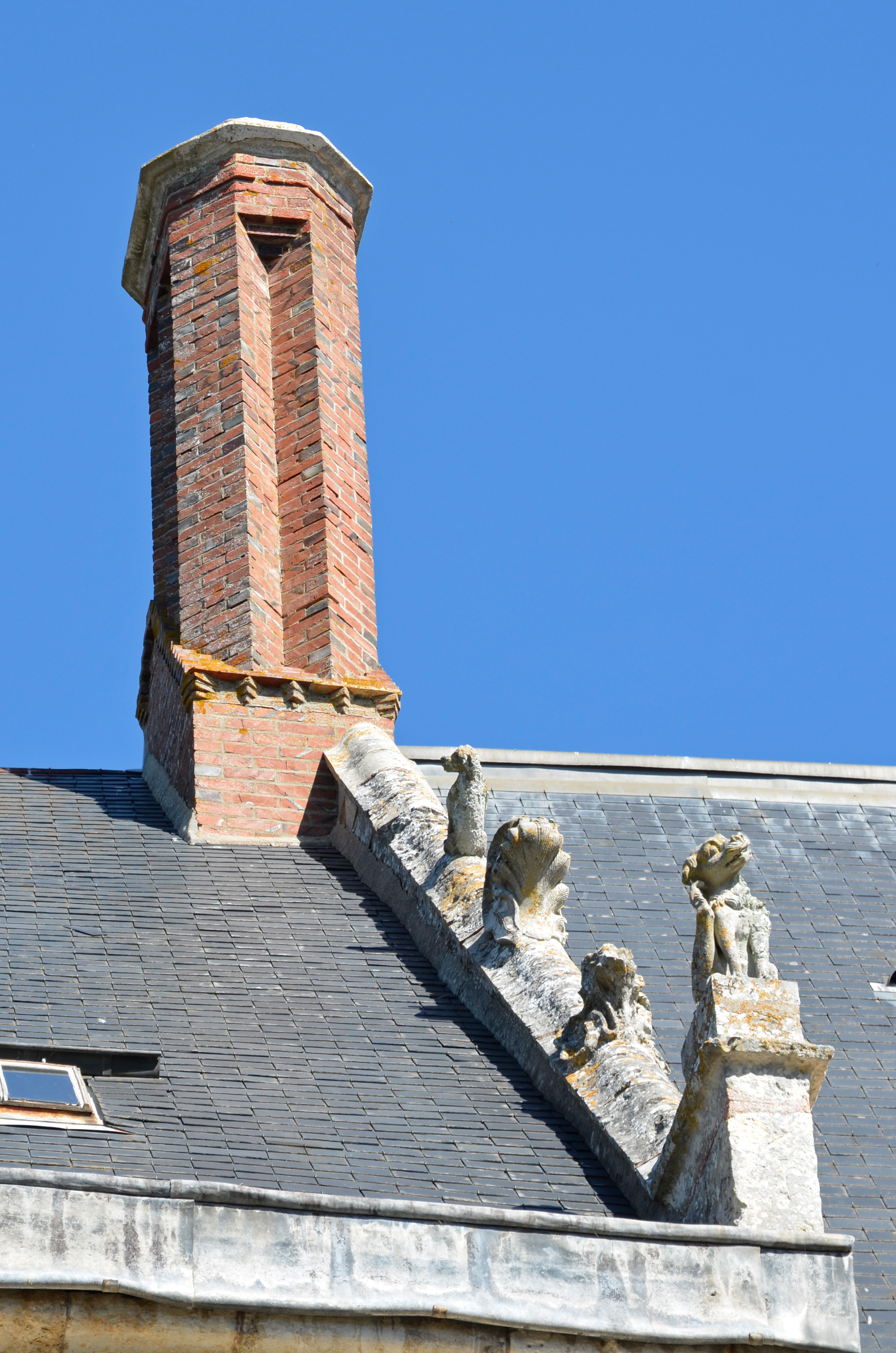
