= Edith of Wilton =

English nun and saint (c. 961 – 984)

Saint Edith of Wilton OSB
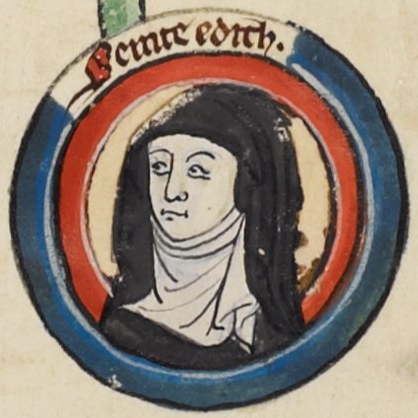
- Saint Edith in a 13th-century miniature
- Born: c. 961; Kemsing, Kent
- Died: c. 984; Wilton Abbey, England
- Venerated in: Catholic Church; Eastern Orthodox Church; Anglicanism
- Major shrine: Wilton Abbey
- Feast: 16 September
- Attributes: Learning, beauty
- Patronage: Wilton Abbey

Edith of Wilton (c. 961 – c. 984) was an English saint, nun and member of the community at Wilton Abbey, and the daughter of Edgar, King of England (r. 959–975) and Saint Wulfthryth. Edith's parents might have been married and Edgar might have abducted Wulfthryth from Wilton Abbey, but when Edith was an infant, Wulfthryth returned with Edith and their marriage was dissolved. Edith and her mother remained at Wilton for the rest of their lives.

Like her mother, Edith was educated at Wilton. From a young age, Edith chose to enter the religious life, although it is uncertain whether she became a nun or a secular member of the Wilton community. Goscelin, who completed her hagiography around 1080, reports that Edith "always dressed magnificently" because it reflected her status as a member of the royal family and because she was obliged to fulfil certain roles to ensure the continued royal patronage of the Wilton community. Goscelin based his Vita on the oral testimony of the Wilton nuns and their abbess, as well as on existing written sources. The work was dedicated to Lanfranc, the Archbishop of Canterbury.

When she was 15 years old, Edith's father offered her the position of abbess of three convents, but she declined. In 978, after the murder of her half-brother, Edward the Martyr, she may have been offered the English throne, which she also refused.

In 984, Edith constructed a chapel at Wilton Abbey dedicated to St Denys. The chapel was consecrated by St Dunstan, the Archbishop of Canterbury, who reportedly foretold her imminent death and that the thumb on her right hand would remain uncorrupted. She died three weeks later, at the age of 23, on 16 September 984 and was buried at the chapel she built as she had instructed. Dunstan presided at her translation, which occurred on 3 November 987; her thumb, as Dunstan had foretold, had not decomposed.

Few miracles were attributed to her that supported Edith's canonisation and her cult did not become popular and widespread for 13 years after her death. Many of the miracles that were reported later focused on the protection of Edith's relics and the property owned by the Wilton community, often violently retaliating against those who sought to take or steal them. The support of Edith's elevation to sainthood by both secular and religious authorities was probably politically motivated, in order to establish their power and to connect themselves to King Edgar's descendants. Her feast day is 16 September.

== Birth and childhood ==
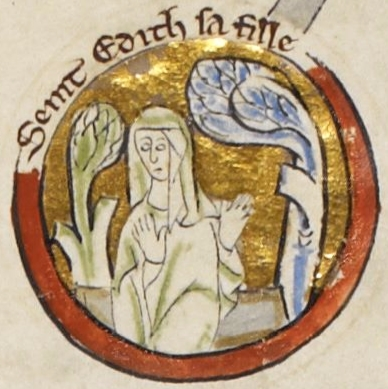
Miniature of Edith of Wilton in a 13th-century royal genealogy

Edith was born around 961 at the royal village in Kemsing, in Kent, England. She was the daughter of King Edgar and Wulfthryth, who was of noble birth, received her education at Wilton Abbey, and later became its abbess. Her half-brothers, Edward the Martyr and Æthelred II, both succeeded their father as king. Barbara Yorke reports that Goscelin, Edith's hagiographer, is unclear regarding the exact date of her birth. Yorke also reports that modern scholars are uncertain regarding Wulfthryth's status. Goscelin states that Wulfthryth was Edgar's wife and Yorke calls Wulfthryth his second wife, but Susan J. Ridyard calls Wulfthryth Edgar's "wife or concubine" and the Oxford Dictionary of Saints calls Wulfthryth his concubine. When Edith was an infant, her parents' marriage was dissolved, in either 963 or 964, which allowed Edgar to remarry and allowed Wulfthryth to become abbess of Wilton shortly after Edith's birth. Goscelin calls Wulfthryth "a sister who had once been [Edgar's] wife".

Edith was dedicated to entering the religious life at Wilton at the age of two. Goscelin describes a ceremony, which Yorke calls "a major state occasion", attended by her father and other royal officials. Stephanie Hollis believes that Edith remained a lay member of the community, although Hollis suggests that Edith's status as a member of the Wilton community was "ambiguous". According to Goscelin, when Edith was two years old, her father visited her at Wilton and presented her with the finest of clothes and jewellery worn by royalty, while her mother placed before her religious objects. Goscelin relates that Edith chose what her mother offered her. Ridyard considers Goscelin's story about Edith similar to many stories told by hagiographers, told to emphasise both the royal status of many saints and their choice to renounce it for the religious life. Ridyard states that Goscelin emphasises this incident, along later stories with her concern and service to criminals, the sick, and the destitute, to demonstrate Edith's humility. Edgar arranged for Edith the best possible education at Wilton by employing "two foreign chaplains", Radbod of Rheims and Benno of Trier.

== Career ==
=== Dress and response to criticism ===
According to Goscelin, Edith's rich and elaborate wardrobe was vindicated when a candle was accidentally dropped into a chest that stored her clothes; the chest was burnt but her clothes remained untouched and the chest remained in the convent as a reminder of the miracle. (Note: The only other miracle Goscelin records that occurred during Edith's lifetime was Æthelwold's attempt to remove a relic of the True Cross from the abbey; Goscelin describes the emotional reactions of both Wulfthryth and Edith as they witnessed the small metal fragment being filed in two, almost as if they were viewing Christ's crucifixion. The next morning, the metal fragments had miraculously been reunited, demonstrating Æthelwold's lack of worthiness to possess it and Edith and her mother's favour from God.) When researching Vita Edithe, his hagiography about Edith, Goscelin viewed her possessions, including "a sumptuous linen alb" she had designed and embroidered, a skill aristocratic women educated in convents like Wilton learned along with literacy, languages, and the arts. Edith wore the garment on special occasions like the reception of royalty or bishops and on high feast days. (Note: Goscelin states that the alb was "very striking with its gold, gems, pearls, and little English pearls, woven around the yoke in keeping with her golden faith and gemlike sincerity; around the feet, the golden images of the Apostles surrounding the Lord, the Lord sitting in the midst, and Edith herself prostrated in the place of Mary the supplicant, kissing the Lord's footprints. Her virginal hands worked this valuable piece with such mystical faith that it should give pleasure for its holiness as much as for its rich embellishment". Bugyis states that Edith's alb is important to scholars of medieval religious women's arts and crafts because "it offers suggestive evidence of their textile work and the interpretative freedom they exercised in recreating biblical scenes in this medium".)

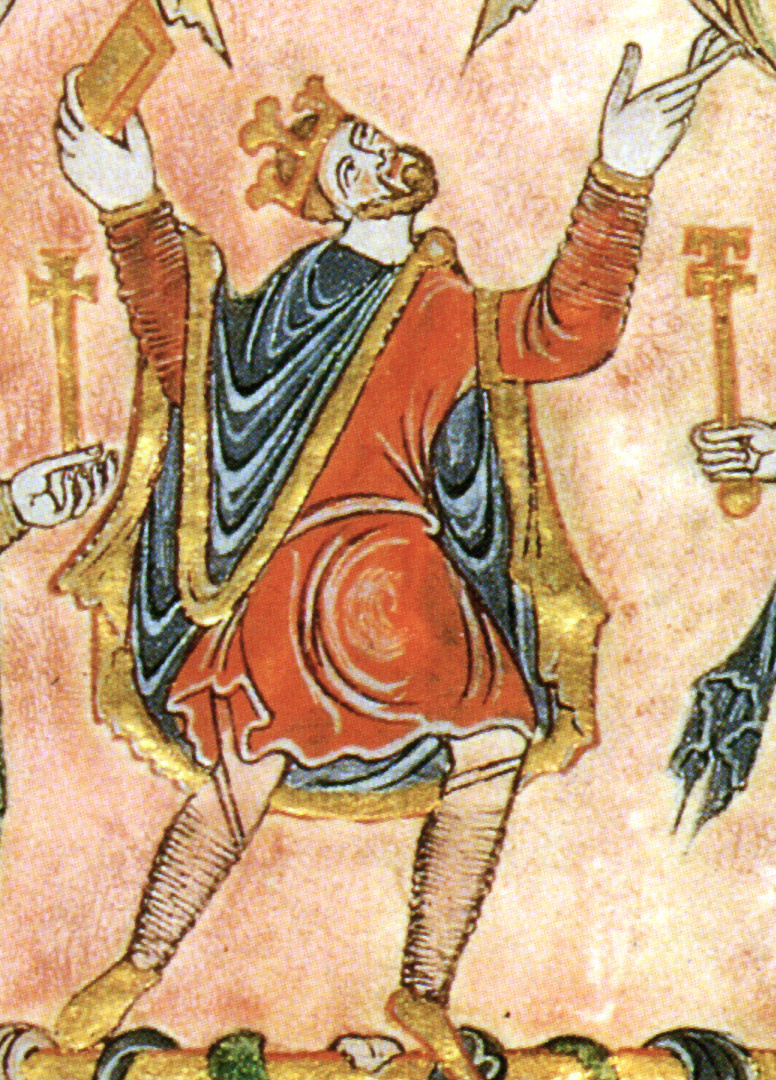
King Edgar, Edith's father

According to Hollis, Goscelin reports that Edith was obliged to wear fine clothing due to her high status and in order to maintain the court's patronage of Wilton, which Hollis states "might have rivalled a royal court in its display of affluence". Other displays of Edith's status and affluence were her design and creation of ecclesiastical vestments, "a metal casket for heating her bath water", her possession of a menagerie of exotic native and imported animals placed at the north wall of the convent, and her mother's rebuilding of the convent, which included a chapel built and designed by Edith. Yorke insists, however, that it appeared that "to all outward appearances she dressed as befitted a princess rather than a specialist in humility". Yorke states that despite Goscelin's claims that Edith and Wulfthryth renounced their wealth and status, they gave up neither. They instead retained their private wealth, a common practice of royals who resided in monasteries and convents, with which they could purchase relics and fund expensive building programmes.

Katie Ann-Marie Bugyis reports that according to Goscelin, Edith copied a manual of prayers used at Wilton Abbey, which the nuns there, along with her relics, preserved. Goscelin praised Edith for her many talents, which included music, embroidery, calligraphy, painting, writing, composing, praying, as well as "a blazing intellect in reading". Hollis calls Edith's manner of dress "evidently habitual", relating Goscelin's story about Edith assisting the workmen who built her chapel by carrying stones in her sleeves. Goscelin insists that her fine clothing, her involvement in royal politics, and her periodic visits to her father's court did not make her less approachable to "the common people".

=== Political and religious influence ===
Histories of the politics of the period only mention Edith in passing, but Yorke argues that claims made by Goscelin in his Vita of Edith that she and her mother played an important role in the intrigues concerning the succession to Edgar should be taken seriously. According to Goscelin, the English nobility and kings from other countries and their ambassadors held her in high regard and "sought her favour by letters and gifts, and high-ranking ecclesiastics sought her intercession". Goscelin states that Edith was able to convince Edgar to overturn court judgements or procure gifts for churches, "with the result that she was besieged by petitioners from all strata of society who hoped she could intervene with the king on their behalf", and that officials from Rome, France, and Germany would visit Edith if they wanted favours from Edgar, often with an addition to her zoo.

According to Goscelin, when Edith was fifteen years old, her father appointed her abbess of three convents, but Sarah Foot describes the appointments as "somewhat implausible" and suggests that Goscelin confused Edith of Wilton with other women named Edith. Ridyard also doubts the veracity of Goscelin and others' claim that Edith was made abbess of any convent. Goscelin claimed that Edith initially refused the positions, preferring instead, as David Hugh Farmer states in the Oxford Dictionary of Saints, "the obscurity of the cloister". Goscelin also stated that Edith insisted on staying under the authority of her mother not because she felt incompetent, but "by an overabundance of humility". According to Goscelin, Edith was an effective abbess of the communities despite her distance and that she visited them often. Very little is known about Edith's governance of the three convents outside of Goscelin's works about her. Both Edith and St Eadburgh of Winchester were praised by William of Malmesbury for their prayers and intercessions on behalf of their respective communities, as well as their members' "unfailing obedience" and devotion to their leaders and teachers.

Goscelin relates that in 978, after the murder of Edward the Martyr, Edith's half-brother, she was offered the throne by opponents of Æthelred II, which she also refused. Edith also had a dream about losing her right eye, which Edith believed foretold her brother's imminent death, which Ridyard calls "highly improbable" and "the creation of an eleventh-century hagiographic imagination which found in the story of Edith's rejection of the earthly a poignant illustration of her devotion to the heavenly". Hollis that it probably occurred because it was an attempt to legitimise the succession of Æthelred and because it was consistent with Edith's manner of dress and her close involvement in royal politics. Ridyard argues that Goscelin relates both stories in order to emphasise "the saint's extreme reluctance to accept a position of authority and influence". The claim that Edith was offered the throne is generally dismissed by historians as a "hagiographic invention", but Yorke argues that it may not have been as far-fetched as it seems, stating that it was "a possibility that Edith would leave Wilton to be married if circumstances dictated" and that her upbringing and education at Wilton, as it was for other well-born Anglo-Saxon women educated there, was to prepare her for a future public role.

A seal was created during Edith's lifetime; later members of Wilton Abbey adopted and used it as its official emblem until the abbey was dissolved in 1539. The seal demonstrates the Wilton community's "confidence in its ability to represent their patron saint as the guarantor of their documents' authenticity and in her guarantee's enduring significance to those in and out of the community". Bugyis states that it "figures her in half-length, frontal view, raising her right hand in a sign of benediction and holding up a book, perhaps the manual of prayers she copied, with her left hand". She is described as a "royal sister" on the seal. According to Alison Hudson, an archivist at the British Library, Edith's seal gives "a rare contemporary insight into the priorities, identities and possibly even the jewellery of a young princess in late tenth century England". Yorke states that Edith's seal was another indication of her status and independent wealth, as well as her affirmation of her status as Edgar's daughter.

According to Bugyis, Edith was not recorded as a former abbess in Nunnaminster sources, but claims that Goscelin described what he regarded as two relics of Edith's rule over Nunnaminster, both of which he considered full of mystical significance and were still used by the community when he wrote about them. One relic was an alb (mentioned above) and the other was a flowering rod, which also according to Bugyis, Goscelin stated had continued to grow even after Edith's death and was reminiscent of Aaron's rod, symbolising her innocence. According to Bugyis, Edith's alb reflected her identification with Mary Magdalene's need to be forgiven of her sins and be remembered for her faith, devotion, and piety, as well as Edith's view of her office as abbess. As Bugyis claims, the alb "reflected the virtue she prized most in a monastic leader—humility", a duty the Benedictine Rule required from its monastic leaders, washing the feet in humble service for members of their communities, as Christ washed his disciples' feet and the woman (often conflated with Mary Magdalene) washed Christ's feet in the Gospel of John. Also according to Bugyis, Edith might have placed herself as Magdalene on her alb in order to represent her commitment to serve the poor and the outcast. Bugyis speculates that Edith's choice of the costly gems, golden thread, and pearls might have also demonstrated the conflict between her roles as abbess and as the king's daughter, as well as a way to inspire her sisters and to provide them with a model of her kind of service and leadership to the community. The alb also demonstrated, as Bugyis claims, that "the liturgical and pastoral ministries of medieval monastic leaders were often inextricably entwined".

== Death ==
In c. 984, shortly before her death, Edith used her own funds to build a chapel at Wilton Abbey dedicated to St Denys. Yorke states that its construction was an indication of her status and wealth; it was made from wood, but had "lavish fittings of gold and semiprecious stones and decorated with a cycle of wall-paintings". According to Ridyard, Goscelin's account of the chapel's dedication "is skilfully juxtaposed with an account of Edith's rejection of an earthly kingdom and is intended to be a final and dramatic illustration of her commitment to the heavenly". It also supports his themes in her Vita about how King Edgar's patronage of the abbey served "the purposes of the heavenly kingdom". Ridyard called the construction of the chapel "Edith's last and most spectacular act of patronage". Goscelin states that the chapel was dedicated by St Dunstan, who towards the end of the ceremony, foretold that she would die in three weeks. According to Goscelin, Dustan, who was impressed by the way she made the sign of the cross, clasped her right hand, and weeping, said, "Never shall this thumb which makes the sign of our salvation see corruption".

According to Hollis, Goscelin reports that at the moment of Edith's death, a nun went to the door of the abbey's church, and looking in, she saw "angels standing in ranks and singing sweetly", One angel with a shining face then approached the nun and told her, "Go back; the angels await the good maiden". Edith was buried at St Denys' chapel according to her instructions. Ridyard relates Goscelin's account that after Edith's death, the nuns at Wilton, including her mother, experienced strange events at her tomb. Goscelin also reports that Dunstan, who might have been her spiritual mentor, was present at Edith's deathbed and presided at her burial. Her funeral and burial was "a state occasion attended by the great and good of the kingdom". Thirty days after her death, Ridyard reports that Edith appeared to Wulfthryth in a vision, assuring her that "she had been well received by her king in eternal grace". Dunstan presided at her translation, which occurred on 3 November 987. Hollis reports that Edith's thumb, as Dunstan had foretold, had not decomposed.

Edith's feast, 16 September, is recorded in five 10th- and 11th-century calendars. The feast of her translation, 3 November, is recorded in two calendars of the period.

== Legacy ==
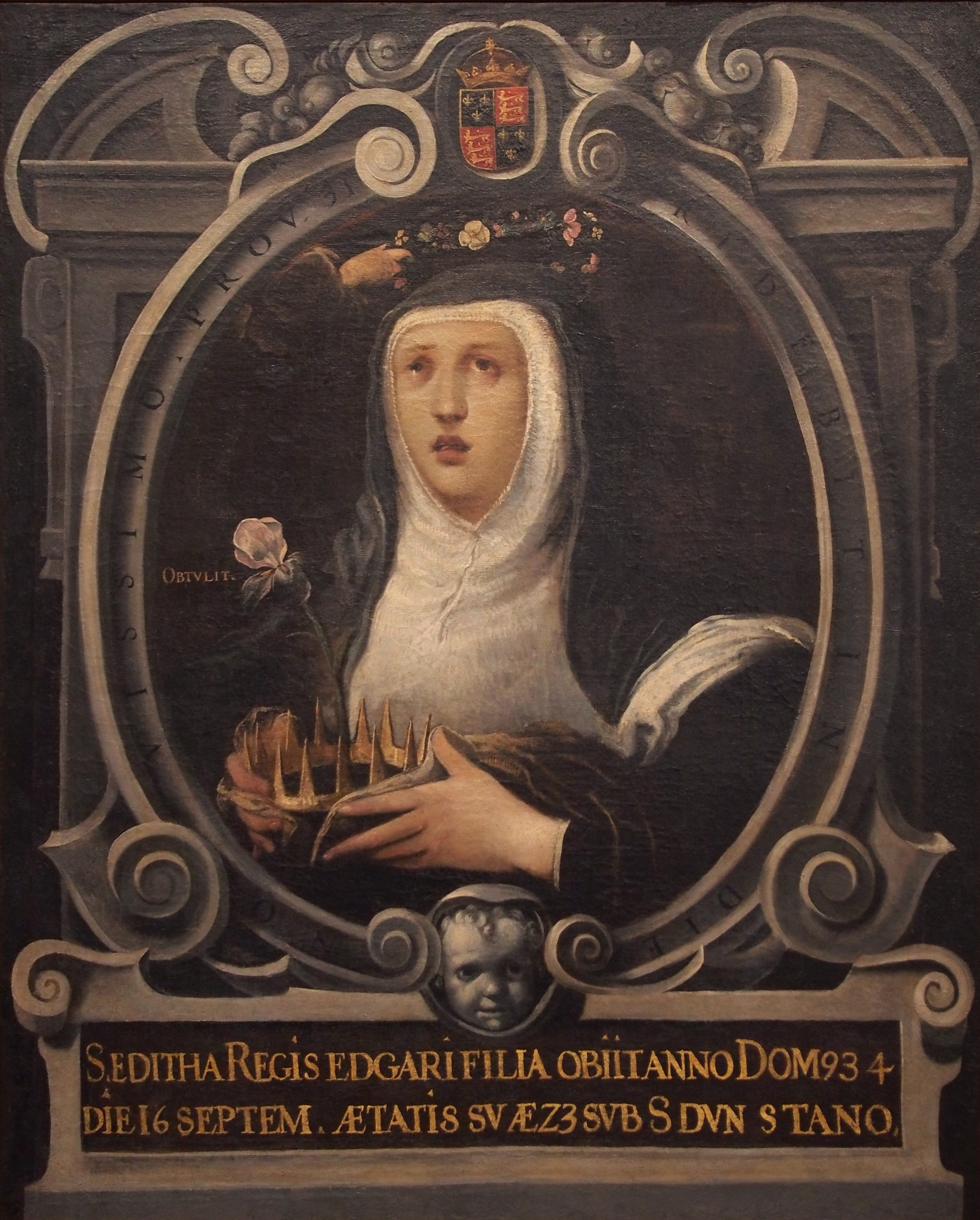
St Edith (image created in 1605)

Yorke argues that Edith had a more interesting career after her death, both for the royal house and for her convent. Ridyard characterises Goscelin's Vita Edithe, which was written between 1078 and 1087 and is considered the main source for Edith's life, as "a vocation narrative" and as one of the "defensive hagiographies" written during the period "to vindicate not only the status of a saint but also the history, the traditions and the political status of a religious community with which that saint was associated" and "an act of monastic propaganda on a grand scale". Goscelin, who had a long-standing association with Wilton, may have been for some time chaplain to the nuns, and he seems to have had a personal devotion to Edith. He wrote poems dedicated to her which were published in a later revision of her Vita. Hollis, however, considers the Vita one of the "only surviving near-contemporary accounts of female communities in the late Anglo-Saxon period", an important historical document, and the earliest and most important source about Edith's legend and cult.

The Vita was completed several generations after the events it describes and was "firmly grounded in the traditions current at Wilton in the final quarter of the eleventh century"; it demonstrates Goscelin's familiarity with and affection for the abbey. He states that he wrote the Vita at the request of both the Wilton community and his patron, Bishop Herman of Salisbury. He draws on the oral testimony of the Wilton nuns and their abbess, as well as "from existing books", as his sources. The Vita was dedicated to Lanfranc, the Archbishop of Canterbury. Goscelin may have written another volume about the Wilton community, the Wilton Chronicle, which also included stories about Edith.

Eve of Wilton, the Benedictine nun, anchoress, and later abbess of Wilton, about whom Goscelin also wrote a hagiography, had a devotion to Edith. According to Hollis, the community began to increase their devotion to Edith and experience more visions of her during Eve's tenure. A later Wilton abbess, Godiva, commissioned Goscelin to write Vita Edithe in 1080 because Wilton "needed the assistance of a powerful supporter". Hollis states that because of Edith's lack of popularity at Wilton and promotion of her cult in the decades following her death, the memories of the nuns who lived there were not subject to what Hollis calls "hagiolatrous transformations and inventions". Much of the information Goscelin gathered about Edith came from Brihtgifu (d. 1065), the daughter of noble parents, who came to the abbey as a child during Wulfthryth's lifetime and later became abbess in the years immediately before the Norman Conquest (c. 1040–1065). Goscelin states that Brihtgifu received her call to religious life from Edith, who was to be Brihtgifu's godmother, but died 30 days before her birth, and during Brihtgifu's baptism at Winchester Cathedral by Æfheah, who became bishop in 984, Edith appeared and helped the infant grasp her baptismal candle; the bishop instructed Brihtgifu's parents to send her to Wilton to be raised and educated. (Note: Goscelin's account of Brihtigifu's baptism has helped scholars pinpoint Edith's death, and by extension, the year of her birth. Ridyard states the 984 is the earliest date when Edith could have died, not necessarily the exact date of her death, since Ælfheah became bishop that year. Yorke supports Ridyard's assertion by pointing out that if the baptism did occur in 984, it could place Edith's birth as early as 961, which would "produce problems in fitting marriage to Wulfthryth to the other known marriages of Edgar".) Bugyis considered Edith's choice to serve as a godparent an important part of Edith's role as a spiritual mother and as a part of her duties as abbess, even though monks and nuns were forbidden to serve as godparents beginning in the sixth century.

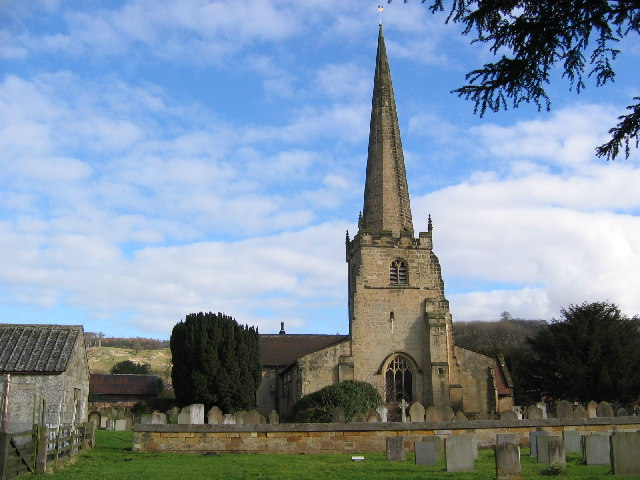
St Edith's Church in Bishop Wilton

According to Ridyard, Edith "lived on in the memory of the Wilton nuns", although Hollis reports that there were few miracles supporting Edith's sainthood in the years following her death. Edith's mother, Wulfthryth, expressed her grief through commemorative masses and by building an almshouse in Edith's memory, but she resisted making public the only miracle reported immediately after Edith's death, Edith's retaliation against a young woman, not identified as a nun, who attempted to steal one of Edith's relics. Goscelin writes that after Edith's death, a group of foreign clerks were unable to remove Edith's relics from Wilton because the relics became too heavy to move, which according to Ridyard, is a common theme in hagiographic literature, in which the saint expresses their preferences about their tomb and relics.

There are two churches dedicated to Edith of Wilton. St Edith's Church in Bishop Wilton, a small village in Yorkshire, continues the tradition of celebrating its village feast on the same day as the saint's feast day, which for Edith, is 16 September. St Editha's Church in Baverstock, a small village four miles from Wilton, is also dedicated to Edith. A third church in Limpley Stoke near Bath was dedicated to Edith for 500 years, but its dedication was changed to St Mary in the 16th century.

In 2023, a pastoral area of the Catholic Diocese of Clifton was named in honour of Edith.

== Sainthood ==
=== Canonisation and miracles ===
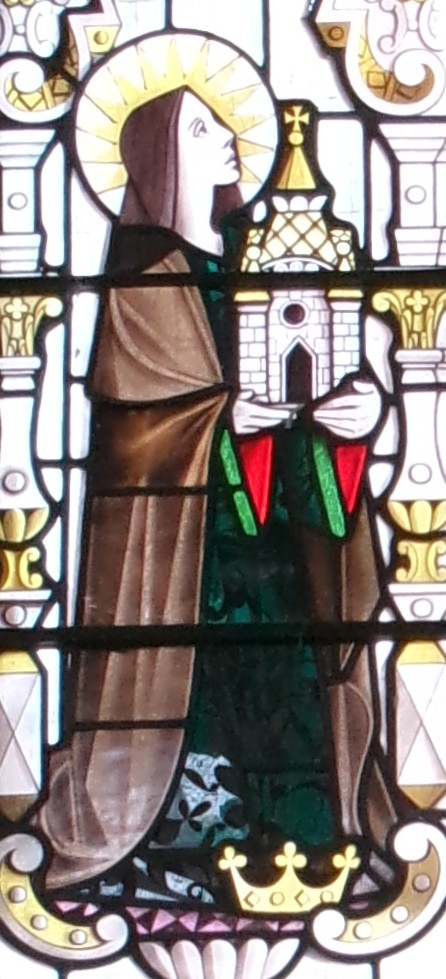
Stained glass depiction of Edith by Harry Stammers in St Mary's Church, Wilton

Edith was elevated to sainthood by her brother King Æthelred II, with the support of Dunstan and other ecclesiastical support, thirteen years after her death. (Note: Hollis believes that the "high level support" of Edith's sainthood may explain why she was one of the few female saints of the period whose feast is included in 11th century calendars.) Her status as a saint is supported by the listing of her tomb at Wilton in On the Resting-Places of the Saints (the Secgan). Ridyard explains the interval between her death and the development of her cult, despite the favourable circumstances, by stating that her promotion to sainthood was removed from the control of the Wilton nuns and taken over by "a number of prominent individuals", all of whom received visions of Edith urging them to elevate her remains. She appeared to Æthelred, to an official with a rank second to the king, to an "unnamed secular magnate", and to Dunstan. According to Goscelin, Dustan was reminded of his prophecy about her incorruption and was ordered to travel to Wilton, "where he would find the body not only incorrupt but also raised up, as though already prepared to leave the tomb". Dunstan received another vision of St Denys, who directed him to perform Edith's translation, which occurred c. 997 and solidified the development of her cult. Ridyard states that both Æthelred and Cnut supported the promotion of her cult to establish their legitimacy as rulers and to connect themselves to the lineage of Edgar's children. Cnut, for example, may have viewed his support of Edith's elevation to sainthood as a way to solidify his connection to West Saxon royalty, which began with his marriage to Æthelred's widow. Goscelin compares Cnut's connection to Edith, especially her piety and miracles, to her familial affections. The Wilton nuns were probably aware of Edith's familial awareness, as well as their "political implications and of their potential usefulness". David Rollason states that the promotion of Edith's sainthood, along with that of Edward, was "a contribution to the prestige and status of the English kings" and that their cults, along with cults of Eadburg of Winchester and Ælfgifu, "were bolstering the ambition and pretension of the English kings".

Shortly after her translation, there were reports of two attempts to steal Edith's relics. According to Goscelin, one involved a Wilton nun who tried to steal Edith's headband but was stopped when Edith's own head was "menacingly raised against her". The other attempt involved a monk from Glastonbury, horrified when he tried to remove a fragment of Edith's clothing from her grave and his knife slipped and touched her body; "a wave of blood gushed forth, as if drawn from a living vein". Cnut, who became king of England in 1016, had a devotion to Edith after she interceded on his behalf and saved him from a sea storm. His experience, along with wanting to associate himself with Æthelred and his family, inspired him to build a golden shrine to store Edith's relics. Cnut, "through divine intervention on Edith's behalf", was able to punish some craftsmen who attempted to steal gold from the shrine and as Ridyard puts it, "Divine vengeance followed quickly" when the workmen were struck blind. Edith performed few miracles between her translation and Cnut's death in 1035, including two healings of Wilton nuns. Both Hollis and Ridyard relate the popular story about a nobleman named Agamund who in the late 1030s, had stolen Wilton properties and had a vision of Edith on his deathbed. She tormented him by preventing him from dying in peace and entering heaven until he returned what he had stolen; Hollis states this story "testifies to fear of Edith among the laity". As Bugyis put it, Edith's had dominion over both the condemnation and salvation of individual souls and demonstrated both her power of judgment and forgiveness, especially as it related to the violation of her community's spiritual and temporal possessions.

According to Ridyard and as reported by Goscelin, Edith "terrorized those who were foolish enough to invade the lands of her church and instilled fear in the hearts of those who might be tempted to emulate those invaders". For example, when a man named Brexius seized land owned by the abbey and refused to make amends on his deathbed, one of his relatives who was also a nun at Wilton, reported having a vision in which she witnessed "the rough treatment" at the hands of Edith. Also according to Ridyard and reported by Goscelin, not only did Edith protect the convent's properties, but she also protected, at times violently, "one further possession which was essential to its prestige, its prosperity and even its identity—the body of St Edith herself". According to William of Malmesbury, on a visit to Wilton King Cnut started jeering at Edith, declaring that he did not believe in the sanctity of a daughter of King Edgar, "an especial slave to lust, and more tyrant than king". When Æthelnoth, Archbishop of Canterbury, defended her, Cnut ordered her tomb to be broken open so that she could prove her sanctity. William claims that Edith emerged from her tomb and launched herself at Cnut, upon which he fainted with fright. On coming to he repented his scepticism and as a result Edith's feast day was widely kept. In Yorke's view, the story was intended to highlight Edgar's reputation for womanising.

=== Prophecies and dreams ===
Edith's cult did not seem to have been established in the Wilton community until c. 1040, when she appeared in almost identical dreams to Ælfgifu, the wife of Æthelred II (who promoted Edith's cult) and Ælfflæd, wife of King Edward the Elder. Ælfgifu's devotion to Edith began after claiming that Edith had healed Ælfgifu of an eye disease and prophesied her promotion to abbess at Wilton during a dream vision. According to the claim, Edith's prophesy came true, but Ælfgifu's tenure was short (c. 1065–1067) also as Edith had predicted. Goscelin writes that Edith chose Ælfgifu to be her successor through a vision received by Ælfgifu and her mentor, Ælfhild, during the tenure of Edith's godchild Brihtgifu as abbess. Goscelin reports that Edith emerged from her tomb and appeared to Ælfgifu while she was praying before another abbess' tomb. Edith bestowed symbols of convent authority upon Ælfgifu, which Bugyis argues justified and endorsed the community's choice of their abbesses during a time when such decisions were made by kings and nobles. Edith's bestowal of the objects to Ælfgifu was also viewed as a sacramental act usually performed by a bishop.

In another vision, Ælfgifu made a deathbed request for Edith's relics and intercession; as she lay dying, Edith told an unnamed nun through a verbal communication in the nun's sleep that the Virgin Mary, through Edith's intercession, "was waiting with a choir of virgin saints to receive her soul". After Ælfgifu's burial, Edith another unnamed nun during a dream vision that the community should pray for Ælfgifu because Edith "had obtained forgiveness from the Lord for all but one of Ælfgifu's offenses, and that she would not cease to intercede for Ælfgifu until she obtained pardon for this offense". As Ridyard put it, "The purposes of the monastic patron, however, were not served exclusively by dire threats and dreadful punishments". For instance, after King Cnut was seemingly saved from a sea storm through Edith's intercession, he expressed his gratitude by endowing gifts to the Wilton convent, including a golden shrine for Edith's body, which was decorated with scenes from the New Testament. Ridyard considers this miracle an example of the connection between Edith's "performance of conventional curative miracles" and the popular and widespread recognition of her cult.

Hollis states that the Wilton community's faith in Edith had diminished after the Norman Conquest because she had failed to help them recover some lost land and fortune and to protect them from a plague. Up to that point, Edith was remembered more for her wardrobe, her private zoo, her political influence, her artistic and literary talents, and the church she built and decorated, than for her holy life and miraculous powers. As both Hollis and Ridyard point out, the Wilton nuns saw Edith as indifferent to the interests of her own convent, even when the nuns there were stricken by illness; as Hollis put it, "It wasn't that she couldn't help them, apparently, but that she wouldn't; either that or she was the laziest saint in England". Edith countered their expectations of her by communicating in "an unattributed dream vision" describing her duties as a universal saint and that it was her duty to assist everyone who asked for her help because she saw no one as an outsider. Edith also affirmed her special relationship with Wilton, but reminded them that they had to "accept their temporal sufferings as a means of becoming spotless brides of the Lord". Ridyard reports that Goscelin attributes to both Edith and Wulfthryth "a number of domestic cures".

Goscelin reports that Edith performed miracles that demonstrated her concern for prisoners and sinners. For example, after a pilgrim from Saxony, along with his twelve companions, were sentenced to being shackled together for a year, which resulted in perpetual movement that did not stop when they were released. The pilgrims travelled to Wilton, slept before Edith's tomb for three days, and woke up to find himself healed, thus releasing him from judgment of his crimes. Goscelin compared this miracle and others to the binding and loosing as described in the Gospel of Matthew, stating that "it superseded the power that was given to the apostles' priestly successors—whatever they bound as punishment for sin, she could ultimately loose".

== Works cited ==
- Bugyis, Katie Ann-Marie (2019). The Care of Nuns: The Ministries of Benedictine Women in England During the Central Middle Ages. New York: Oxford University Press. ISBN 978-0-19-085128-6.
- Diener, Laura Michele (2014). "Sealed with a Stitch: Embroidery and Gift-Giving among Anglo-Saxon Women". Medieval Prosopography. 29: 1–22. JSTOR 44946967.
- Dunbar, Agnes B.C. (1901). A Dictionary of Saintly Women. Vol. 1. London: George Bell & Sons. pp. 252–253 – via Internet Archive.
- Farmer, David Hugh (2011). Oxford Dictionary of Saints (5 ed.). Oxford, England: Oxford University Press. pp. 135–136. ISBN 978-0199596607.
- Foot, Sarah (2019). Veiled Women: Volume II: Female Religious Communities in England, 871-1066. London: Routledge. p. 231. ISBN 978-1-138-25086-4.
- Hollis, Stephanie (2004). "Goscelin's Writings and the Wilton Women". In Hollis, Stephanie (ed.). Writing the Wilton Women: Goscelin's Legend of Edith and Liber confortatorius. Turnhout, Belgium: Brepols Publishers. pp. 217–244. ISBN 2-503-51436-7.
- Hudson, Alison (30 June 2017). "Making a Good Impression". British Library.
- Lawson, M. K. (2011). Cnut: England's Viking King 1016-35 (2nd ed.). Stroud, UK: The History Press. ISBN 978-0-7524-6069-7.
- Pratt, Kate (8 February 2006). "St Edith" (PDF). Bishop Wilton Local History Bulletin, No. 13. pp. 1–4.
- Ridyard, Susan J. (1988). The Royal Saints of Anglo-Saxon England: A Study of West Saxon and East Anglian Cults. New York: Cambridge University Press. ISBN 0-521-30772-4.
- Rollason, David (1989). Saints and Relics in Anglo-Saxon England. Cambridge, Massachusetts: Basil Blackwell. ISBN 0-631-16506-1.
- Watt, Diane (2019). Women, Writing and Religion in England and Beyond, 650–1100. London: Bloomsbury Publishing. ISBN 978-1-4742-7064-9.
- Winterbottom, Michael, ed. (2007). William of Malmesbury: Gesta Pontificum Anglorum, The History of the English Bishops (in Latin and English). Vol. 1. Oxford, UK: Clarendon Press. ISBN 978-0-19-820770-2.
- Yorke, Barbara (2004). Oxford Dictionary of National Biography. Oxford, England: Oxford University Press. ISBN 019861411X.
- Yorke, Barbara (2003). "The Legitimacy of St Edith". Haskins Society Journal. 11: 97–113. ISSN 0963-4959.
- Yorke, Barbara (2008). "The Women in Edgar's Life". In Scragg, Donald (ed.). Edgar, King of the English,959–975: New Interpretations. Rochester, New York: Boydell Press. pp. 143–157. ISBN 978-0-19-861412-8. OCLC 866857119.
