= Æthelred, King of the East Angles =

9th-century king of East Anglia

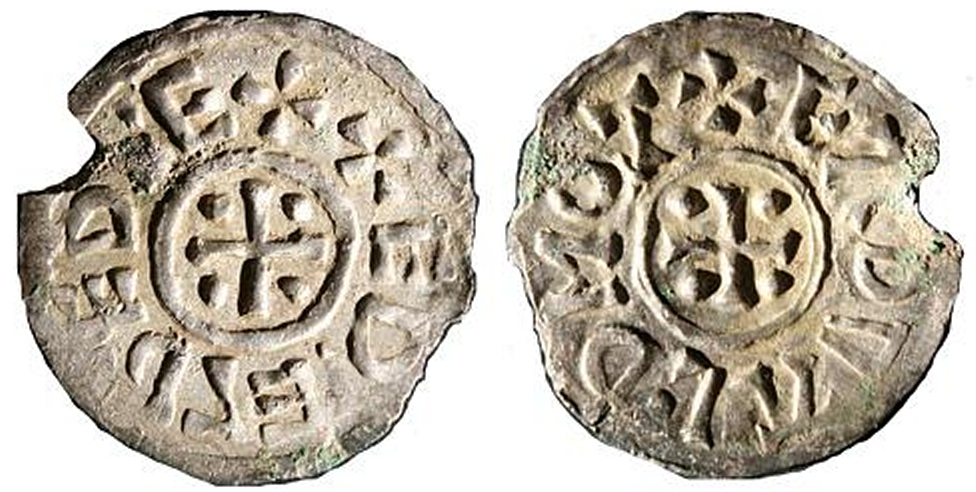
Coin of Æthelred.

Æthelred (fl c. 870s) was a king of the East Angles.

In 869 a Viking army conquered the Anglo-Saxon kingdom of East Anglia and killed King Edmund the Martyr. Coins of Æthelred and Oswald, kings of the East Angles date to the 870s, and they were probably client kings of the Vikings. Both kings are only known from their coins. Six coins are known of Æthelred and two of Oswald. Earlier ones continue designs of Edmund, and later semi-legible designs are of a Carolingian-inspired temple design also used by Guthrum, who succeeded as Viking king of the East Angles in about 979. Three of the moneyers who worked for Æthelred and Oswald had also worked for Edmund.

== Sources ==
- Kirby, D. H. (2000). The Earliest English Kings (Revised ed.). London, UK: Routledge. ISBN 978-0-415-24211-0.
- Naismith, Rory (2017). Britain and Ireland c.400-1066. Medieval European Coinage: with a Catalogue of the Coins in the Fitzwilliam Museum, Cambridge. Vol. 8. Cambridge, UK: Cambridge University Press. ISBN 978-0-521-26016-9.
- Williams, Gareth (2014). "Coins and Currency in Viking England, AD 865–954". In Naismith, Rory; Allen, Martin; Screen, Elina (eds.). Early Medieval Monetary History: Studies in Memory of Mark Blackburn. Abingdon, Oxfordshire: Routledge. pp. 13–38. ISBN 978-0-367-59999-7.
- Yorke, Barbara (1990). Kings and Kingdoms of Early Anglo-Saxon England. London, UK: Routledge. ISBN 978-0-415-16639-3.

English royalty
Preceded by Oswald	King of East Anglia; 870s	Succeeded by Guthrum
