= Wulfthryth of Wilton =

Saint and abbess from Anglo-Saxon England

- Died: c. 1000
- Burial place: Wilton Abbey church
- Partner: Edgar, King of England
- Children: Edith of Wilton
- Relatives: Wulfhilda of Barking (cousin)

Wulfthryth, also known as Wilfrida (died c. 1000), was the second known consort of Edgar, King of England, in the early 960s. Historians disagree whether she was his wife or mistress. In 964, Edgar married Ælfthryth, and then or earlier Wulfthryth returned to Wilton Abbey, where she had been educated. She was accompanied by her daughter Edith, who was widely revered in the eleventh century as a saint. Wulfthryth remained there for the rest of her life as abbess and died on 21 September in an unknown year, around 1000. She was regarded as a saint at Wilton, but her cult did not spread more widely.

== Primary sources ==
Wulfthryth is known to history through several sources, including the hagiography of the Secgan Manuscript, John of Worcester's Chronicle, William of Malmesbury, Osburn's life of Dunstan, the Life of St Wulfthryth found in The Wilton Chronicle, A Royal Charter of King Edgar to Wulfthryth, and the Vita Edithae by Goscelin. The medieval source record her as living an exemplary life of sanctity and virtue, and her virtues were often contrasted to the machinations of Edgar's second (third?) wife, Ælfthryth.

== Life ==
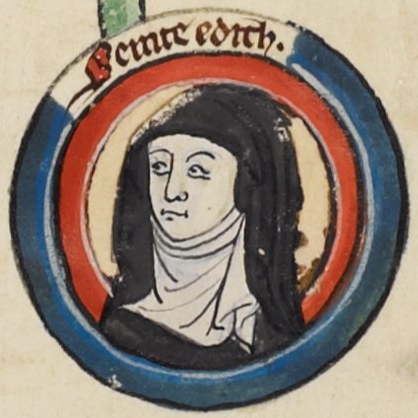
Near contemporary drawing of Edith.

Wulfthryth was an English noblewoman, a younger cousin of Wulfhild, born about 937, whom King Edgar of England carried off from the nunnery at Wilton Abbey and took to his residence at Kemsing, near Sevenoaks. While in Kent, Wulfthryth gave birth to a daughter, Edith. Goscelin and William of Malmesbury agree that Edgar married her, but that she renounced their marriage shortly after Edith was born. Edith was dedicated into religious life at Wilton as an infant; her mother followed her shortly afterwards.

After at least a year, Wulfthryth returned to Wilton Abbey, taking Edith with her. She later became head of the abbey and outlived her daughter. According to scholar Katie Ann-Marie Bugyis, Wulfthryth "exemplifies the spiritual fecundity that a matron could achieve as a monastic leader', her "experience as a biological mother" did not prevent her from becoming an abbess, and the community did not consider her loss of virginity an obstacle to becoming a successful monastic leader.

According to early monastic texts, under Saint Dunstan's direction Edgar did penance for this crime by not wearing his crown for seven years. As part of his penance, Edgar gave Wilfrida six estates in Wiltshire and the Isle of Wight which she passed on to Wilton Abbey in 965AD. Some form of bride abduction, often more simulated force than actual, by this time, may have existed as a vestige of earlier Anglo-Saxon tradition, and historians have alternatively referred to Wilfrida as Edgar's concubine or his second wife, although never as a captive. Given the religious customs of the time, his penance was probably related to his violation of the sanctity of her religious vocation, rather than to any personal affront to Wilfrida. It is clear that the two may have had a continuing friendship long after her return to Wilton. In any event, Edgar seems to have acknowledged Edith as his daughter; the relationship may have been considered a marriage, despite the formal church sanction, as was the custom of the time, and if so, Edith was a legitimate daughter.

Wulfthryth continued to have considerable influence upon Edgar after her return to Wilton. She was able to stop bailiffs from arresting a thief who had taken sanctuary in the Abbey, and was able to secure the release of two Wilton priests who had been imprisoned by the reeve of Wilton. As Abbess of Wilton, she built a stone wall around the Abbey, and also used her wealth to build up the abbey's collection of relics. Goscelin calls her the "hidden treasure and light" of the Abbey, and she was held in high esteem during her life. and she is credited with miracles during her lifetime, and Alms giving.

== Veneration ==
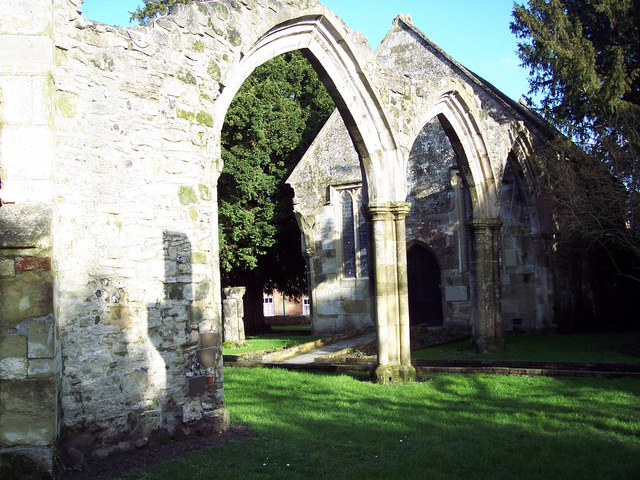
St Mary's church, Wilton

Both Wulfthryth and her daughter Edith were regarded as saints after their lifetimes. Wulfthryth died at Wilton on 21 September, probably in the year 1000, and was buried before the main altar of the Wilton Abbey church.

Her Feast Day is 13 September.
