= Agnes Jordan =

Abbess of Syon Monastery

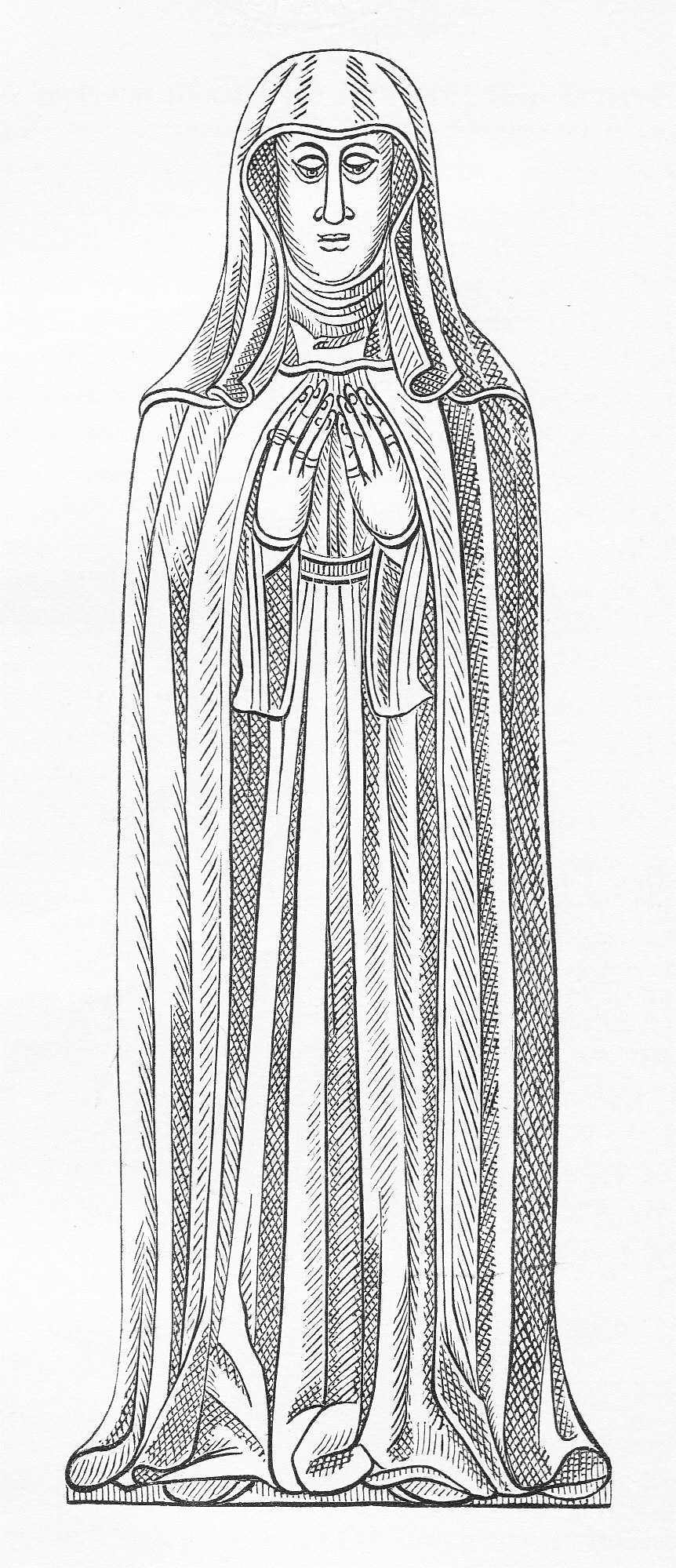
Funerary Brass of Dame Agnes Jordan from Denham Church, Buckinghamshire

Agnes Jordan (before 1520 – 29 January 1546) was the last pre-reformation Abbess of Syon Monastery. It was she who had to sign the deed of surrender on 25 November 1539 which brought to an abrupt end the life of the abbey and granted all its property and wealth to Henry VIII. She was the sister of Isabel Jordan, prioress and later abbess of Wilton Abbey.

== Biography ==
The exact birth year of Agnes Jordan is unknown, but it is known that she had a sister, Isabel Jordayne, who also became a nun and abbess at Wilton Abbey. Nothing is known about her life before 1520, when she was elected as the abbess, succeeding Constance Browne (1518-1520; d.1520) who died during the same year. In 1530, Jordan commissioned a printing of The Mirror of Our Lady, a commentary on the sisters’ office. Between November 1536 and 29 October 1537, Jordan was both host and jailer to Lady Margaret Douglas. Douglas was confined because of her unauthorized marriage to Lord Thomas Howard.

By the time she became abbess, the train of events leading to the Dissolution of the Monasteries and the demise of the abbey was already underway. Having assented to the Act of Supremacy in 1534, Jordan and the nuns at Syon were visited by two commissions of enquiry in the following year, looking at the wealth and morality of the abbey. Syon was at this time the richest nunnery in England. When the dissolution process began in 1536, as one of the larger abbeys, Syon was not immediately affected, but there was some impact as the abbess took in the prioress and two nuns displaced from a small Benedictine house in Somerset.

Syon Abbey was suppressed and dissolved on 25 November 1539 by Henry VIII. Jordan was forced to sign a deed of surrender, which granted the property of the abbey to Henry VIII, who destroyed the building shortly after.

Her will was written on 28 October 1545 and Jordan died on 29 January 1546. She was buried on 9 February 1546 at Denham, Buckinghamshire. Her Funerary Brass is now held in Denham Church, Bucks and her tombstone has since been lost, probably sometime between 1840 and 1904. The tombstone read:

Of your charitie pray for the soul of Dame Agnes Jordan, sometime Abbess of the monastery of Sion, which departed this life the 29th day of January in the year of our Lord God 1545. On whose soule Jesus have mercy. Amen!
