= Fontibus =

Fontibus is a surname. Notable people with the surname include:

- Galfridus de Fontibus, English hagiographer
- Godefridus de Fontibus, scholastic philosopher and theologian
- John de Fontibus (died 1225)
- Robert de Fontibus, abbot of Inchcolm (1491-1492)
