= Edmund the Martyr =

King of East Anglia from about 855 until 869

Edmund
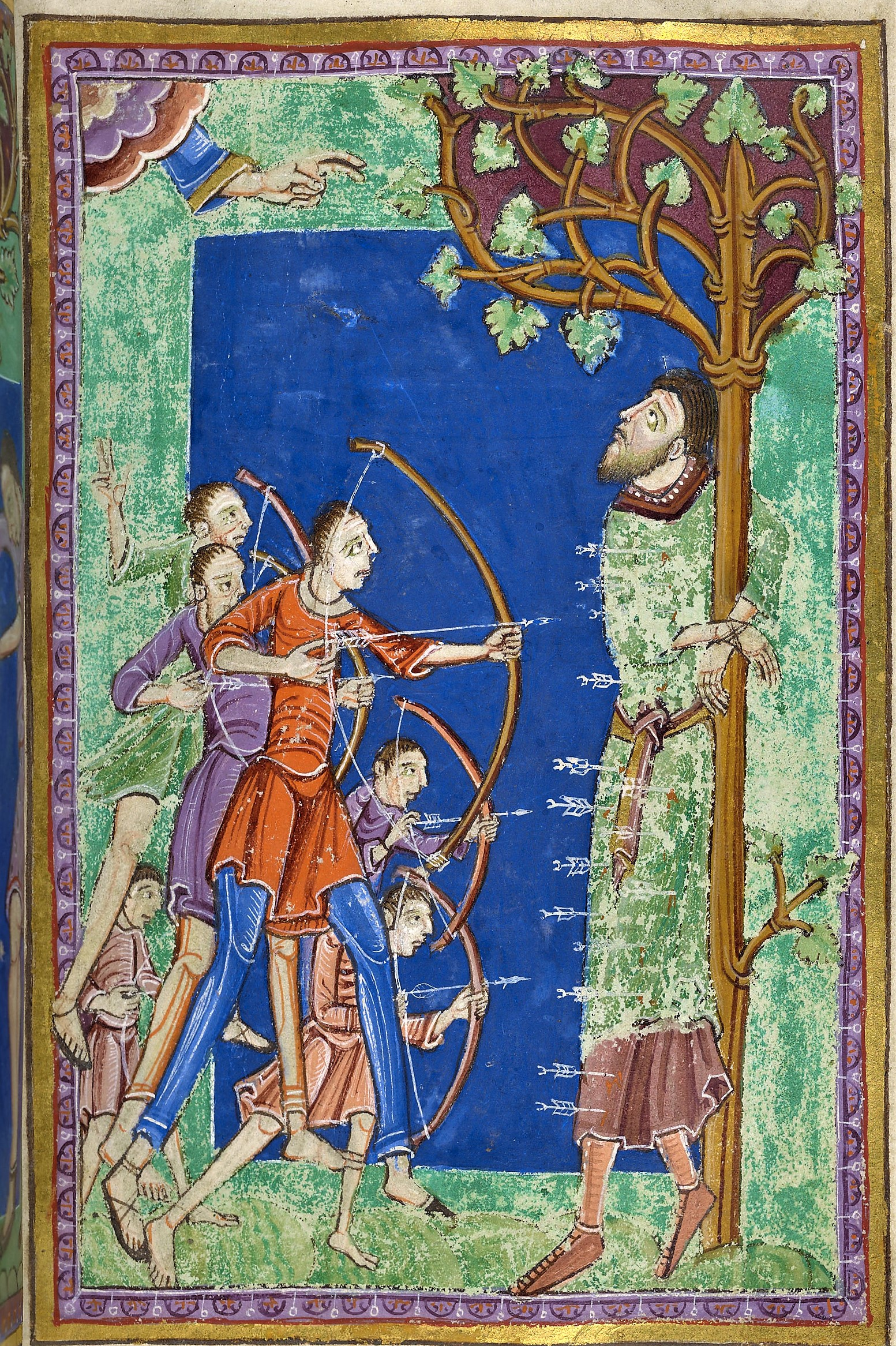
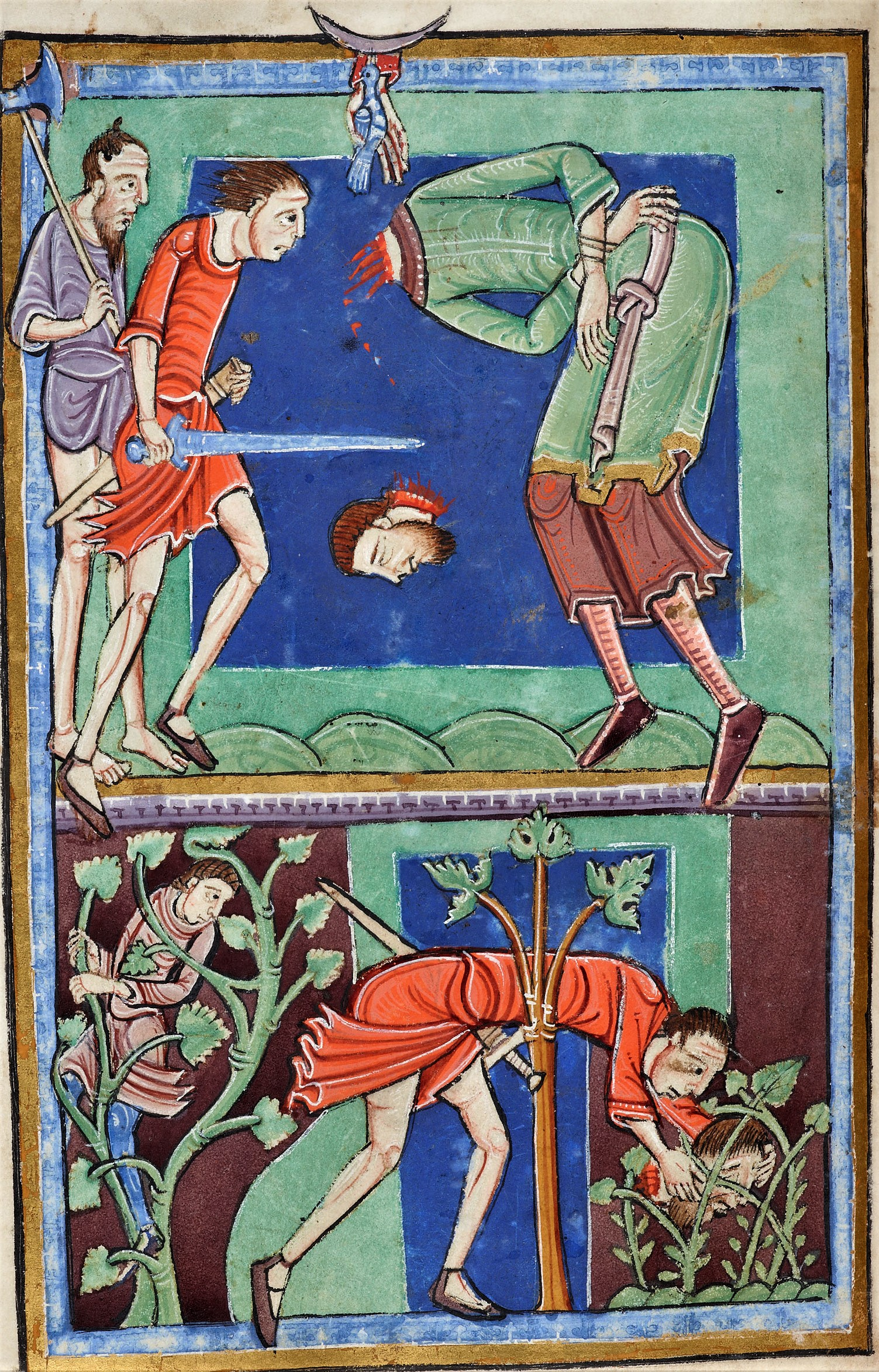
- The martyrdom of Edmund: Folios 14r and 14v from the 12th-century Passio Sancto Eadmundi (Morgan Library & Museum, New York)

King of the East Angles
- Reign: c. 855 – 20 November 869
- Predecessor: Æthelweard
- Successor: Oswald
- Died: 20 November 869; East Anglia

Edmund the Martyr (also known as St Edmund and Edmund of East Anglia, died 20 November 869) (Note: The year of Edmund's death may have been 870, according to some calculations. The uncertainty has arisen because the Anglo-Saxon Chronicle sometimes began in September, meaning that an event that took place in November 869 (according to the modern calendar) would have been recorded by the Anglo-Saxons as having taken place in 870.) was king of East Anglia from about 855 until his death.

Few historical facts about Edmund are known, as East Anglia was devastated by the Vikings, who destroyed any contemporary evidence of his reign. Coins minted by Edmund indicate that he succeeded Æthelweard of East Anglia, as they shared the same moneyers. He is thought to have been of East Anglian origin, but 12th-century writers produced fictitious accounts of his family, succession and his rule as king. Edmund's death was mentioned in the Anglo-Saxon Chronicle, which relates that he was killed in 869 after the Great Heathen Army advanced into East Anglia. Medieval versions of Edmund's life and martyrdom differ as to whether he died in battle fighting the Great Heathen Army or if he met his death after being captured and then refusing the Viking leaders' demand that he renounce Christ.

A popular cult emerged after Edmund's death, and he was canonised by the Church. A series of coins commemorating him was minted from around the time East Anglia was absorbed by the kingdom of Wessex in 918, and in about 986, the French monk Abbo of Fleury wrote of his life and martyrdom.

During the 10th century, Edmund's remains were translated from an unidentified location in East Anglia to Beodericsworth (modern Bury St Edmunds); they were temporarily moved to London for safekeeping in 1010. Edmund's cult flourished during the Early and High Middle Ages, and he and Edward the Confessor were regarded as the patron saints of medieval England until they were replaced by Saint George in the 15th century. Medieval manuscripts and works of art relating to Edmund include Abbo's Passio Sancti Eadmundi, John Lydgate's 15th-century Life, the Wilton Diptych, and a number of church wall paintings.

== King of the East Angles ==
=== Accession and rule ===
The kingdom of the East Angles

The existence of Edmund is known from coins minted by his moneyers, three of whom—Dudda, Eadmund, and Twicga—minted coins for Edmund's predecessor, Æthelweard which suggests that a smooth transition of power occurred. The number of coins issued in his name indicates that he reigned for a number of years, but the only contemporary documentary references to Edmund are the records of his death in Asser's life of Alfred the Great and the Anglo-Saxon Chronicle. The 12th-century Annals of St Neots states that Edmund succeeded on Christmas Day 855 aged fourteen and was crowned by Bishop Hunberht on Christmas Day 856 at a royal vill in Burna in Suffolk, but no source is known for these statements. The devastation in East Anglia that was caused by the Vikings destroyed all the charters that may have referred to Edmund.

Edmund cannot be placed within any ruling dynasty. The 10th-century French monk Abbo of Fleury stated that Edmund was ex antiquorum Saxonum nobili prosapia oriundus, which according to Ridyard "was probably Abbo's rather verbose way of saying he was descended from the ancient nobility of his race".

A variety of coins were minted by Edmund's moneyers during his reign. The letters AN, standing for 'Anglia', appear on the coins of only Edmund and Æthelstan, another 9th-century king of the East Angles; the letters appear on Edmund's coins as part of the phrase + EADMUND REX AN[GLORUM] ("Edmund, King of the Angles"). Edmund's later coins read + EADMUND REX ("Edmund, King"). Otherwise, no chronology for his coins has been confirmed.

=== Death and burial ===
For decades after the Viking raid on Lindisfarne in 793, their attacks on England were mainly raids on isolated monastic communities. According to the Annales Bertiniani and the Anglo-Saxon Chronicle, a larger-scale attack occurred in c. 844. By the end of the decade the Vikings had started to over-winter in England. In the autumn of 865 a force probably numbering over 5,000 combatants, described by the Anglo-Saxon Chronicle as "a great heathen army", came to East Anglia. Edmund made peace with them and gave them horses and other supplies, and they stayed there until the summer of 866, when they moved on to York. The army attacked Mercia by the end of 867 and made peaceful terms with the Mercians; a year later the Vikings returned to East Anglia.

The Anglo-Saxon Chronicle, which generally described few matters relating to the East Angles and their rulers, relates that "here the army rode across Mercia into East Anglia, and took winter-quarters at Thetford; and that winter King Edmund fought against them, and the Danish took the victory, and killed the king and conquered all that land". Where Edmund was killed and whether he died in battle or was murdered by the Danes afterwards is not known. The Great Heathen Army went on to invade Wessex in late 870, where they were confronted by Æthelred of Wessex and his brother, the future Alfred the Great.

Edmund was buried in a wooden chapel near to where he was killed. At a date generally assumed by historians to have been during the reign of Æthelstan, who became king of the Anglo-Saxons in 924, Edmund's body was translated from Haegelisdun (the location of which has not been conclusively identified) to Beodricesworth, now modern Bury St Edmunds. In 925 Æthelstan founded Beodricesworth monastery to take care of Edmund's shrine.

== Memorial coinage ==
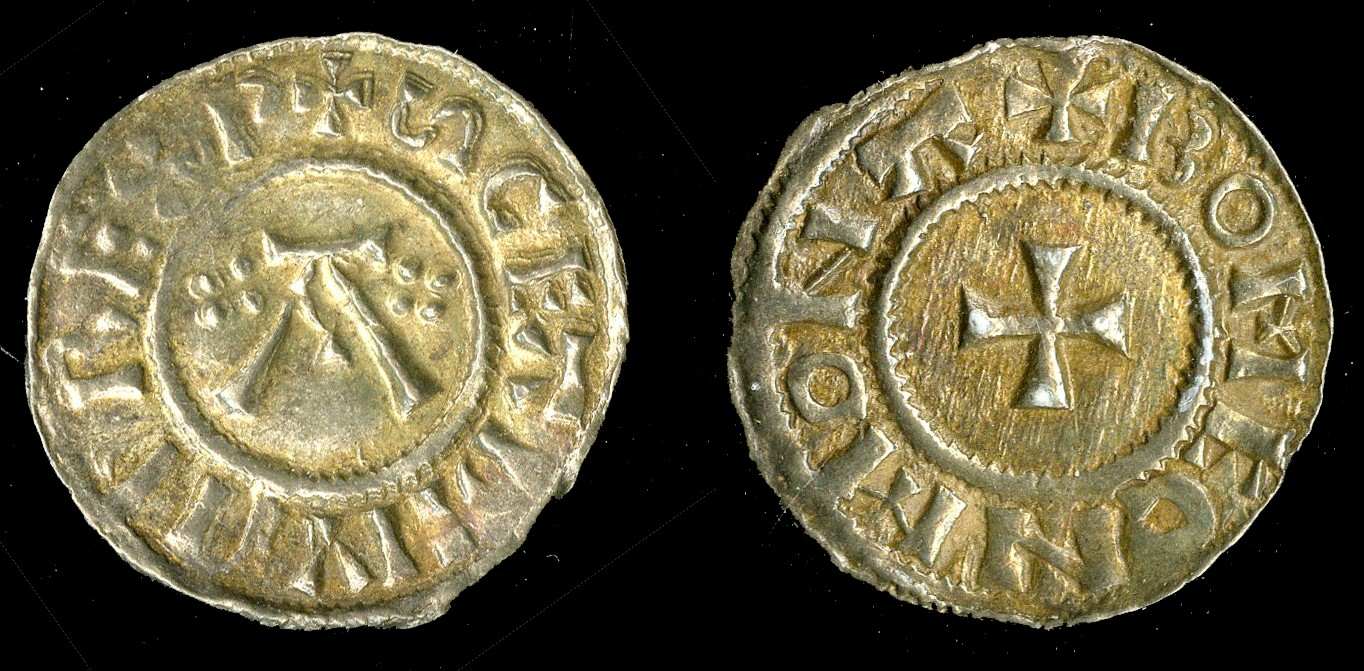
A St Edmund memorial penny (British Museum)

Following the death of the Danish Guthrum, king of East Anglia, in around 890, (Note: Guthrum who ruled East Anglia under the baptismal name of Æthelstan.) the same moneyers who had minted his coins started to produce money in commemoration of Edmund. The coins, whose design was based upon those produced during Edmund's reign, provide the earliest evidence that he was venerated as a saint. All the pennies and (more rarely) half-pennies that were produced read SCE EADMVND REX—'O St Edmund the king!'. Some of them have a legend that provides evidence that the Vikings experimented with their initial design.

The St Edmund memorial coins were minted in great quantities by a group of more than 70 moneyers, many of whom appear to have originated from continental Europe; over 1,800 specimens were found when the Cuerdale Hoard was discovered in Lancashire in 1840. The coins were widely used within the Danelaw. They have mainly been found in the east of England, but the exact location of any of the mints they came from is not known with certainty, although scholars have assumed that they were made in East Anglia.

== Veneration ==
=== Cult at Bury St Edmunds ===
Saint Edmund the Martyr
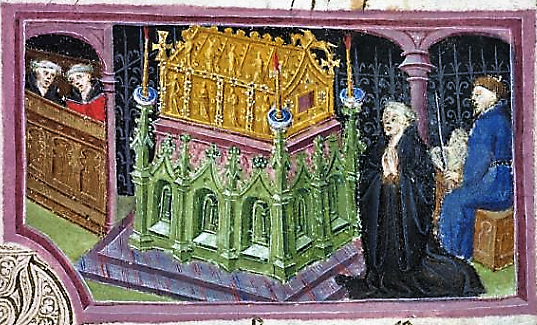
- John Lydgate prays at the shrine of St Edmund, from a folio of Lives of SS Edmund and Fremund (British Library)
- Venerated in: Catholic Church; Anglican Communion; Eastern Orthodox Church
- Major shrine: Bury St Edmunds, destroyed during the Dissolution of the Monasteries
- Feast: 20 November
- Attributes: An arrow or a sword, a hand-held orb and sceptre, wolf
- Patronage: Kings, pandemics, wolves, torture victims, protection from the plague

Edmund's cult was promoted and flourished, but it declined, with the production of St Edmund coins ceasing after around 910. The saint did not reappear in liturgical calendars from the 9th century until the appearance of Abbo of Fleury's Passio Sancti Eadmundi three centuries later. In 1010, Edmund's remains were translated to London to protect them from the Vikings, where they were kept for three years before being returned to Bury.

The Danish king Canute, who ruled England from 1016, converted to Christianity and was instrumental in founding the abbey at Bury St Edmunds. The new stone abbey church was completed in 1032, having possibly been commissioned by Canute in time to be consecrated on the 16th anniversary of the Battle of Assandun, which took place on 18 October 1016. Edmund's shrine became one of the most famous and wealthy pilgrimage locations in England. The abbey's power grew upon being given jurisdiction over the western half of the county of Suffolk by the creation in 1044 of the Liberty of Saint Edmund, established by Edward the Confessor, and a larger church was built in 1095, into which Edmund's relics were translated. (Note: The Liberty remained a separate jurisdiction under the control of the abbot of Bury St Edmunds Abbey until the dissolution of the monasteries in the 1530s.) After the Norman Conquest of England in 1066, the abbot planned out over 300 new houses within a grid-iron pattern at a location that was close to the abbey precincts, a development which caused the town to more than double in size. King John is said to have given a great sapphire and a precious stone set in gold to the shrine, which he was permitted to keep upon the condition that it was returned to the abbey when he died.

Edmund's shrine was destroyed in 1539, during the dissolution of the monasteries. According to a letter (now in the British Library's Cotton Collection), the shrine was defaced, and silver and gold to the value of over 5,000 marks was taken away. The abbot and his monks were expelled and the abbey was dissolved.

=== Cult at Toulouse ===
In 1664, a lawyer from the French city of Toulouse publicized a claim that Edmund's remains had been taken from Bury by the future Louis VIII of France following his defeat at the Battle of Lincoln in 1217. The relics had then been donated by Louis to the Basilica of Saint-Sernin, Toulouse. The first record of this is a relic list for Saint-Sernin of around 1425, which included St Edmund among the church's relics.

In 1644, after the city was saved from the plague from 1628 to 1631, which the population ascribed to the intercession of a saint known to the church authorities as Aymundus, who they decided was Edmund. In gratitude for its deliverance, the city vowed to build a new reliquary for the saint's remains. Edmund's cult flourished there for over two centuries. The reliquary, designed by Jean Chalette, was silver and adorned with solid silver statues. In 1644, the relics were verified and catalogued for interment in the newly-completed shrine, by which time the cult's origins had been forgotten. Edmund's shrine was removed in 1794 during the French Revolution. The saint's relics were restored to the Basilica of Saint-Sernin in 1845 and placed in a new reliquary.

=== Relics at Arundel ===
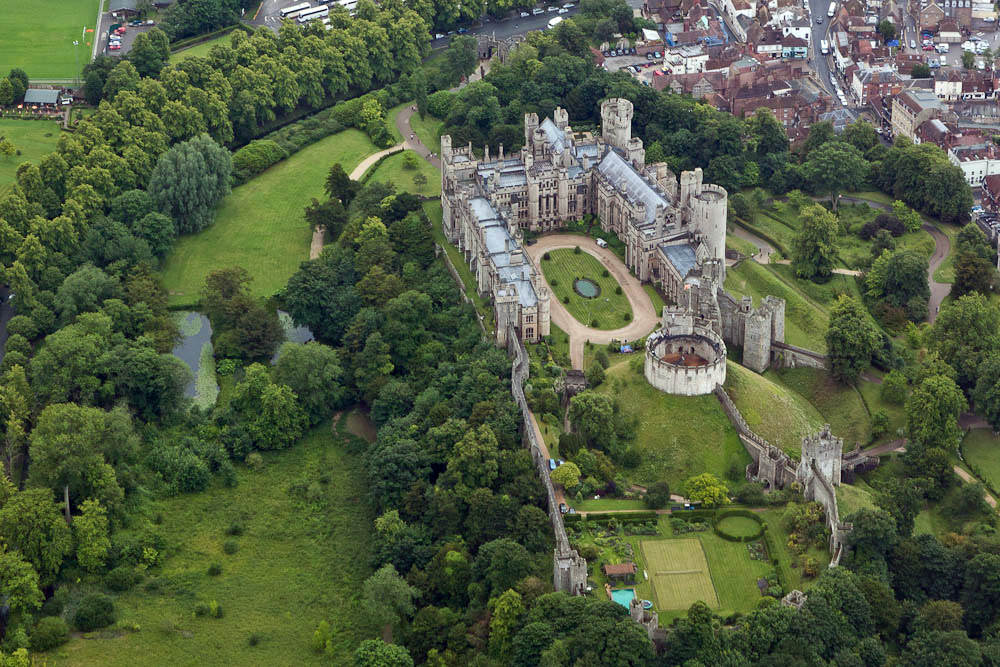
Arundel Castle in West Sussex

In 1901 the Archbishop of Westminster, Herbert Vaughan, received "certain relics" from the Basilica of Saint-Sernin. The relics, believed at the time to be those of St Edmund, were intended for the high altar of London's Westminster Cathedral, which was then under construction.

The acceptance of the relics required the intercession of Pope Leo XIII, after an initial refusal by the church in France. Upon their arrival in England they were housed in the Fitzalan Chapel at Arundel Castle prior to their translation to Westminster. Although their validity had been confirmed in 1874, when two pieces were given to Edward Manning, Archbishop of Westminster, concerns were raised about the authenticity of the Arundel relics by Montague James and Charles Biggs in The Times. The relics remained at Arundel under the care of the Duke of Norfolk while a historical commission was set up by Cardinal Vaughan and Archbishop Germain of Saint-Sernin. They remain as of 1993 at Arundel. In 1966 three teeth from the collection of relics from France were given to Douai Abbey in Berkshire.

=== Commemoration and attributes ===
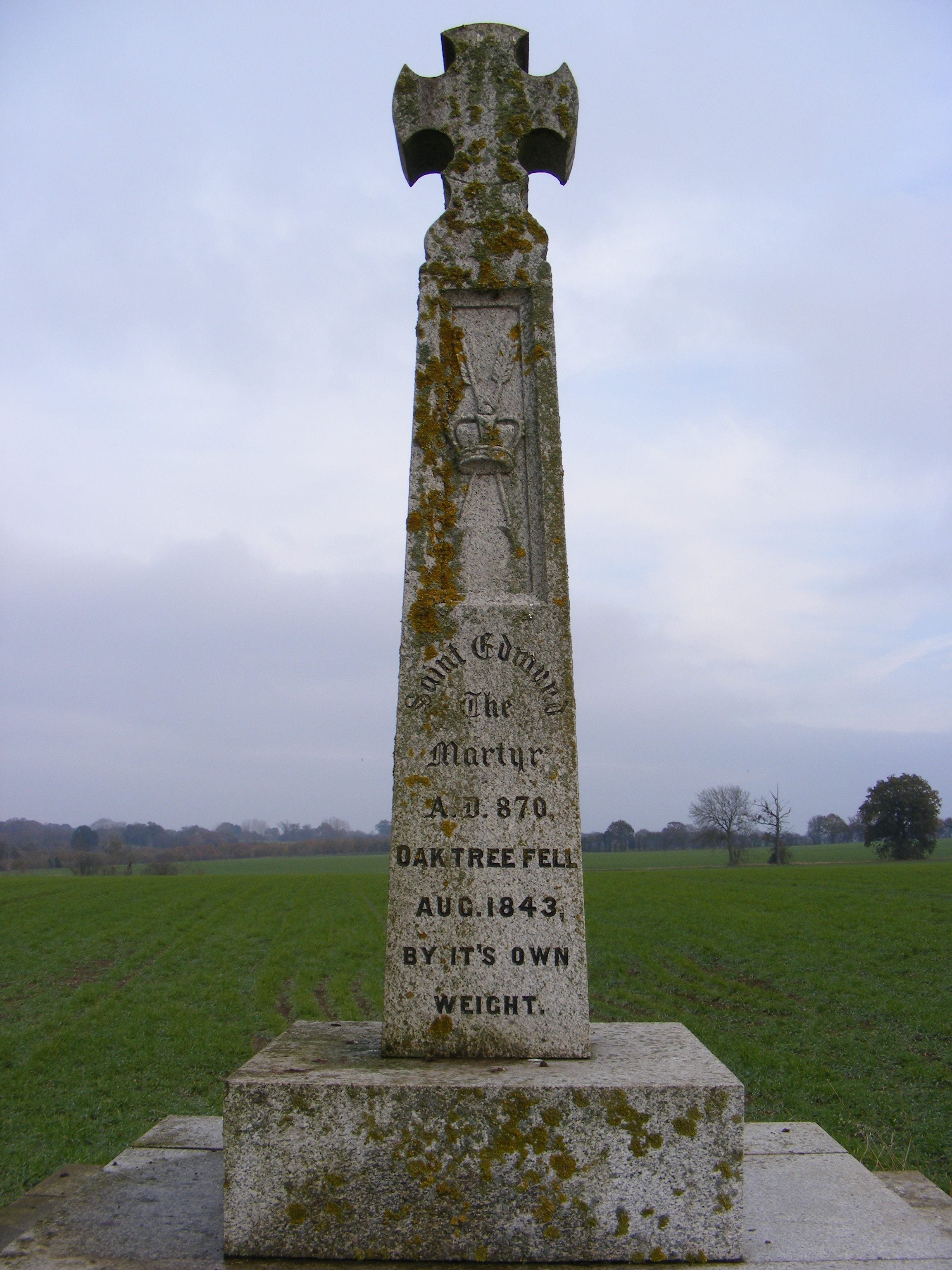
Monument in Hoxne, Suffolk, marking the location of an ancient oak tree, supposed to be the site of Edmund's death.

The feast day of Edmund, King and Martyr in the Catholic Church is 20 November. He is also remembered in the Church of England, with a Lesser Festival on this day of the year. Edmund's particular attributes are the arrow and the sword, being an English king, his attributes include the orb and sceptre. According to the Oxford Dictionary of Saints, his attribute can also be a wolf.

A stone cross at Hoxne in Suffolk marks one supposed location of Edmund's death. The monument records that it was built on the site of an ancient oak tree which fell in 1848 and was found to have an arrow head embedded in its trunk. Some fifty-five Church of England parish churches are dedicated to Edmund, perhaps the most notable being the Church of St Edmund, King and Martyr, Lombard Street in the City of London. The Benedictine community of Douai Abbey also has Edmund as its patron. There is a St Edmund's chapel at the East end of Tewkesbury Abbey

== Medieval hagiographies and legends ==
=== Passio Sancti Eadmundi ===
In about 986, the monks of Ramsey Abbey commissioned Abbo of Fleury to write Edmund's passio, or account of his martyrdom. According to Abbo, St Dunstan, Archbishop of Canterbury, was the source of the story of the martyrdom, which he had heard told long before, in the presence of Æthelstan, by an old man who swore an oath that he had been Edmund's sword-bearer.

In Abbo's version of events, the king refused to meet the Danes in battle, preferring to die a martyr's death. According to Ridyard, Edmund's martyrdom cannot be proven and the nature of his fate—whether he died fighting or was murdered after the battle—cannot be read from the Anglo-Saxon Chronicle. Ridyard notes that the story that Edmund had an armour-bearer implies that he would have been a warrior king who was prepared to fight the Vikings on the battlefield, but she acknowledges the possibility that such later accounts belong to "the realm of hagiographical fantasy".

Edmund's death, according to Ælfric of Eynsham

"King Edmund, against whom Ivar advanced, stood inside his hall, and mindful of the Saviour, threw out his weapons. He wanted to match the example of Christ, who forbade Peter to win the cruel Jews with weapons. Lo! the impious one then bound Edmund and insulted him ignominiously, and beat him with rods, and afterwards led the devout king to a firm living tree, and tied him there with strong bonds, and beat him with whips. In between the whip lashes, Edmund called out with true belief in the Saviour Christ. Because of his belief, because he called to Christ to aid him, the heathens became furiously angry. They then shot spears at him, as if it was a game, until he was entirely covered with their missiles, like the bristles of a hedgehog (just like St Sebastian was).

When Ivar the impious pirate saw that the noble king would not forsake Christ, but with resolute faith called after Him, he ordered Edmund beheaded, and the heathens did so. While Edmund still called out to Christ, the heathen dragged the holy man to his death, and with one stroke struck off his head, and his soul journeyed happily to Christ."

— Ælfric of Eynsham, Old English paraphrase of Abbo of Fleury, 'Passio Sancti Eadmundi'

Abbo named one of Edmund's killers as Hinguar, who can probably be identified with Ivarr inn beinlausi (Ivar the Boneless), son of Ragnar Lodbrok. After describing the horrific manner of Edmund's death, the Passio continued the story. His severed head was thrown into the wood. As Edmund's followers searched for him, calling out "Where are you, friend?" the head answered, Her, her, her ("Here! Here! Here!") until at last they found it, clasped between a wolf's paws, protected from other animals and uneaten. The followers then recovered the head.

Abbo failed to date these events surrounding Edmund's translation to Beodericsworth, although from his text it can be seen that he believed that the relics had been taken to Beodericsworth by the time that Theodred became Bishop of London in around 926. Upon exhumation of the body, a miracle was discovered. All the arrow wounds upon Edmund's undecayed corpse had healed and his head was reattached. The last recorded inspection of the body whilst at Bury St Edmunds was in 1198.

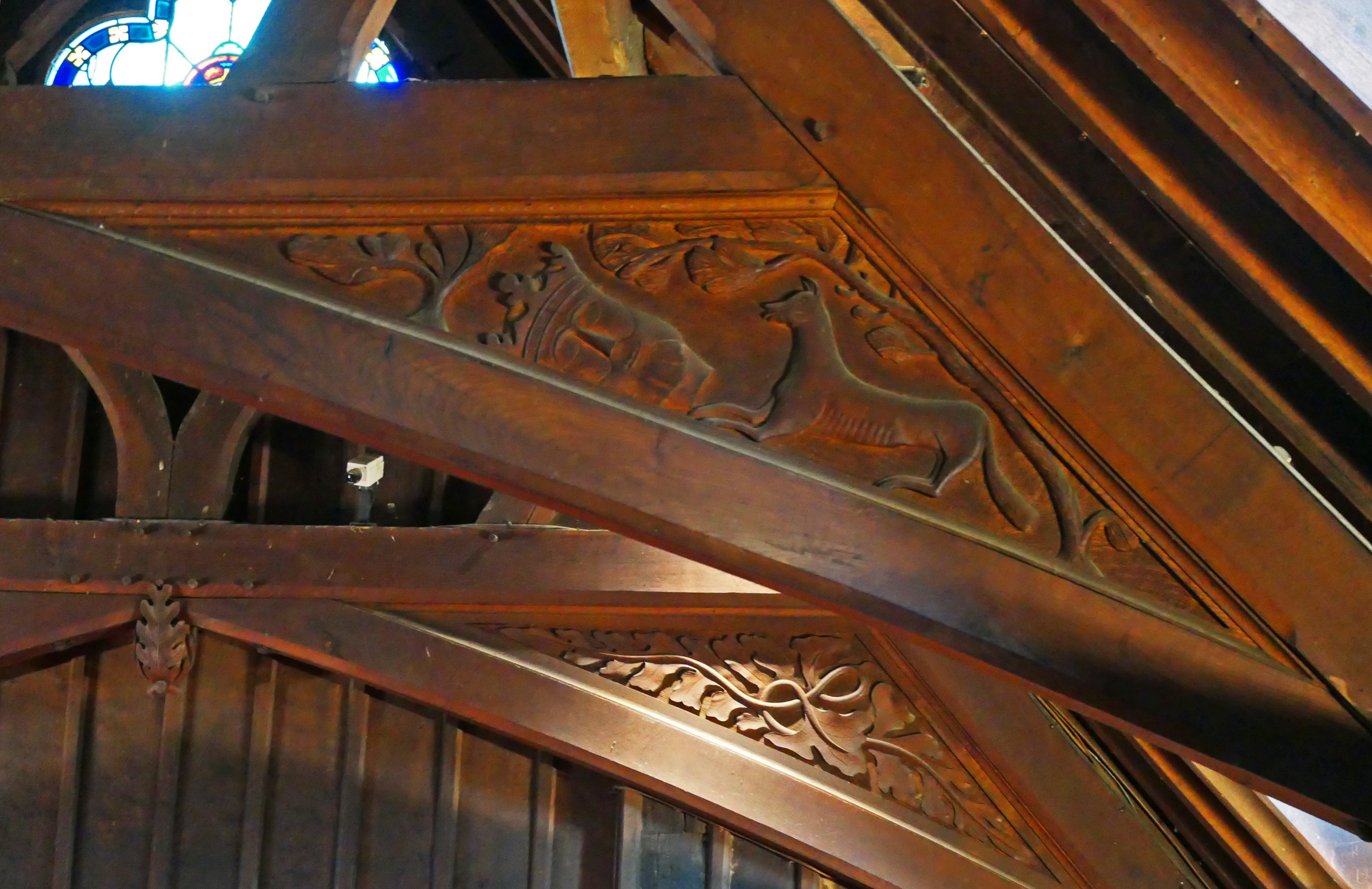
A 19th-century carving depicting the wolf guarding Edmund's head, in St Andrew's Church, Greensted-juxta-Ongar.

The resemblance between the deaths of St Sebastian and St Edmund was remarked upon by Abbo: both saints were attacked by archers, although only Edmund is supposed to have been decapitated. His death bears some resemblance to the fate suffered by other saints: St Denis was whipped and beheaded and the body of Mary of Egypt was said to have been guarded by a lion. The English medievalist Antonia Gransden described Abbo's Passio as "little more than a hotch-potch of hagiographical commonplaces" and argues that Abbo's ignorance of what actually happened to Edmund would have led him to use aspects of the Lives of well-known saints such as Sebastian and Denis as models for his version of Edmund's martydom. Gransden acknowledged that there are some aspects of the story—such as the appearance of the wolf that guards Edmund's head—that do not have exact parallels elsewhere.

=== Miracles of St Edmund ===
Herman the Archdeacon, who was an excellent Latinist, wrote another hagiography of Edmund, the Miracles of St Edmund, at the end of the 11th century. His original text does not survive, but a shortened version is part of a book dating to around 1100 produced by Bury St Edmunds Abbey, which is composed of Abbo's hagiography, followed by Herman's. The hagiographer and musician, Goscelin, soon afterwards produced a revised version of Herman's Miracles, which was hostile to Herman personally. Both versions are printed and translated by Tom Licence.

=== Other legends ===
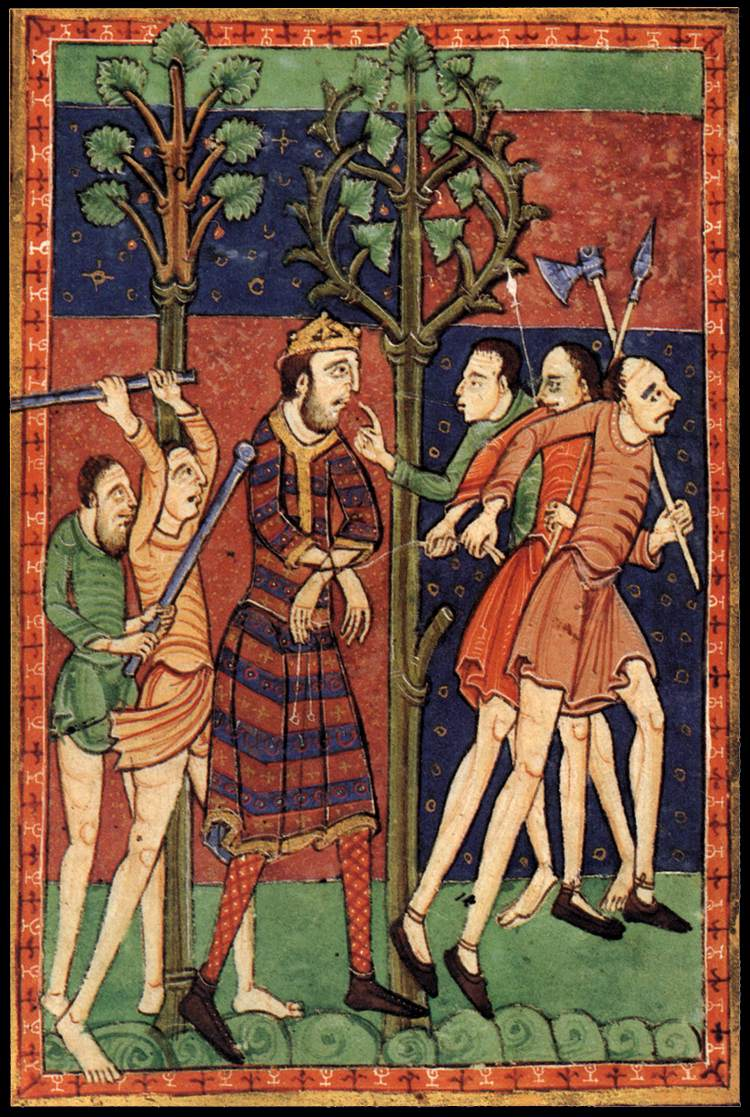
A 12th-century depiction of Edmund's martyrdom (Morgan Library & Museum, New York)

De Infantia Sancti Edmundi, a fictitious 12th-century hagiography of Edmund's early life by the English canon Geoffrey of Wells, represented him as the youngest son of 'Alcmund', a Saxon king of Germanic descent. 'Alcmund' may never have existed. Edmund's fictitious continental origins were later elaborated upon in the 15th century by the poet John Lydgate in his The Lives of Saints Edmund and Fremund. Lydgate spoke of his parentage, his birth at Nuremberg, his adoption by Offa of Mercia, his nomination as successor to the king and his landing at Old Hunstanton on the North Norfolk coast to claim his kingdom.

Biographical details of Edmund in the Catholic Encyclopedia, published in 1913, include that "he showed himself a model ruler from the first, anxious to treat all with equal justice, and closing his ears to flatterers and untrustworthy informers". It was written that he withdrew for a year to his royal tower at Hunstanton and learned the whole Psalter, so that he could recite it from memory.

Edmund may have been killed at Hoxne. His martyrdom is mentioned in a charter that was written when the church and chapel at Hoxne were granted to Norwich Priory in 1101. Place-name evidence has been used to link the name of Hoxne with Haegelisdun, named by Abbo of Fleury as the site of Edmund's martyrdom, but this evidence is dismissed by the historian Peter Warner. The association of Edmund's cult with the village has continued into modern times. (Note: Until 1849, an old tree stood in Hoxne Park that was believed to be where Edmund had been martyred. In the heart of the tree, an arrowhead was found. A piece of the tree was used to form part of an altar of a church dedicated to Edmund. Another legend relates that after being routed in battle, Edmund hid under the Goldbrook bridge at Hoxne, but his hiding place was revealed to a wedding party, who gave him away to his enemies.) Dernford in Cambridgeshire, and Bradfield St Clare (near Bury St Edmunds) are other possible sites for where Edmund was martyred. (Note: However, there is a spot where places named in the early accounts occur close together. A field called 'Hellesdon' lay just south of Pitcher's Green at Bradfield St Clare; Sutton Hall stands a mile south of Bradfield St Clare on the parish boundary; Kingshall Farm, Kingshall Green and Kingshall Street occur in Rougham, two miles to the north. Bradfield St Clare is approximately six miles from Bury St Edmunds, which was an Anglo-Saxon royal vill (settlement). A monastery already existed, founded by King Sigeberht in 633AD. There was also a building called Bradfield Hall that stood within the St Edmund's Abbey, and accounts show that the Abbey's Cellarer paid rent for small pieces of land at Bradfield St Clare Hall (6 shillings 8d pence) and Sutton Hall (3s 2d.).) In a preface to Lydgate's Life, in which Edmund's banner—depicting three crowns set on a blue background—is described, the crowns are said to represent Edmund's martyrdom, virginity and kingship. (Note: The three crowns banner (representing the coat of arms of Bury St Edmunds) appears in Lydgate's book.)

The ancient wooden St Andrew's Church, Greensted-juxta-Ongar in Essex, is said to have been a resting place for his body on the way to Bury St Edmunds in 1013.

== Patronages ==
Edmund is the patron saint of pandemics as well as kings, the Catholic diocese of East Anglia, and Douai Abbey. England did not ever have a single patron saint before the Tudor period; during the Middle Ages, several saints were considered to have a close association with England and to be nationally important: St Edmund; St Gregory the Great; St Edward the Confessor; St Thomas Becket; and St George. Of these saints, Edmund was the most consistently popular with English kings, although Edward III raised the importance of George when he associated him with the Order of the Garter.

In 2006, BBC Radio Suffolk radio presenter Mark Murphy and David Ruffley, the Member of Parliament for Bury St Edmunds, failed in their campaign to reinstate Edmund as the patron saint of England. (Note: Ruffley had taken up the cause and helped deliver a large petition to the government in London. Prime Minister Tony Blair rejected the request; however, their attempt was successful on another level: "St Edmund (was) named patron saint of Suffolk...the high point of a successful campaign which was launched by Breakfast show presenter Mark Murphy and producer Emily Fellows in the autumn of 2006".) In 2013, BBC News reported a new campaign launched by Murphy and the brewer Greene King, which is based in Bury St Edmunds, to reinstate St Edmund as England's patron saint. Supporters of the campaign stated their hopes that a petition could be used to force Parliament to debate the issue.

== In art ==
The veneration of Edmund throughout the centuries has created a legacy of noteworthy works of art. An illustrated copy of Abbo of Fleury's Passio Sancti Eadmundi, made at Bury St Edmunds in around 1130, is now kept at the Morgan Library in New York City. The copy of John Lydgate's 15th-century Life, written for Henry VI of England, is held at the British Library. The Wilton Diptych was painted during the reign of Richard II of England and is the most famous representation of Edmund in art. Painted on oak panels, it shows Edmund and Edward the Confessor as the royal patrons of England presenting Richard to the Virgin and Child. The poet John Lydgate (1370–1451), who lived all his life in Bury St Edmunds, presented his twelve-year-old king Henry VI of England with a long poem (now known as Metrical Lives of Saints Edmund and Fremund) when Henry came to the town in 1433 and stayed at the abbey for four months. The book is now kept by the British Library in London. Edmund's martyrdom features on several medieval wall-paintings to be found in churches across England. (Note: Churches with surviving wall paintings of Edmund can be found at Medieval Wall Painting in the English Parish Church Archived 12 June 2012 at the Wayback Machine website: D to F.)

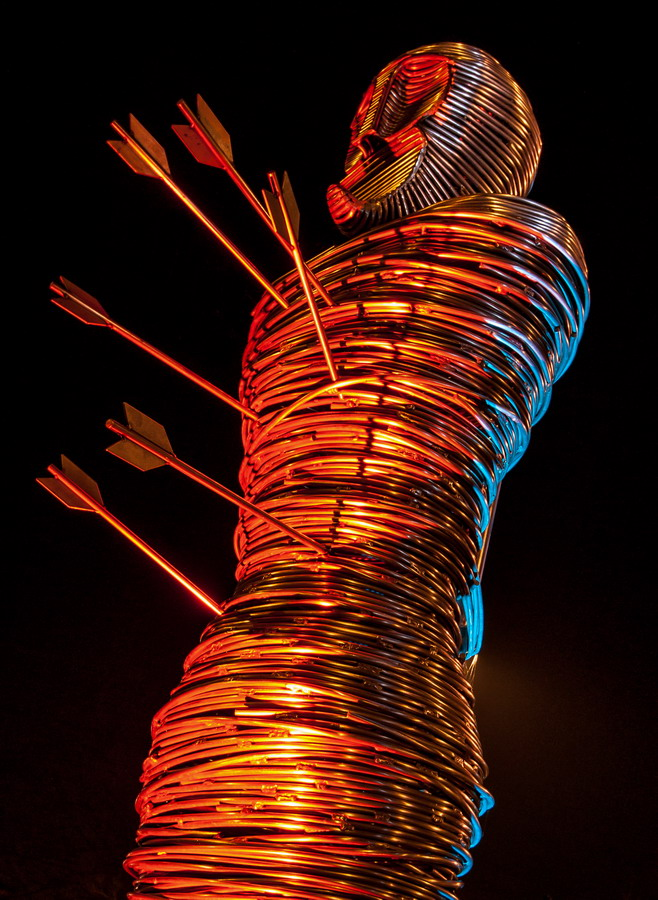
St Edmund (2011), Bury St Edmunds, pierced by arrows

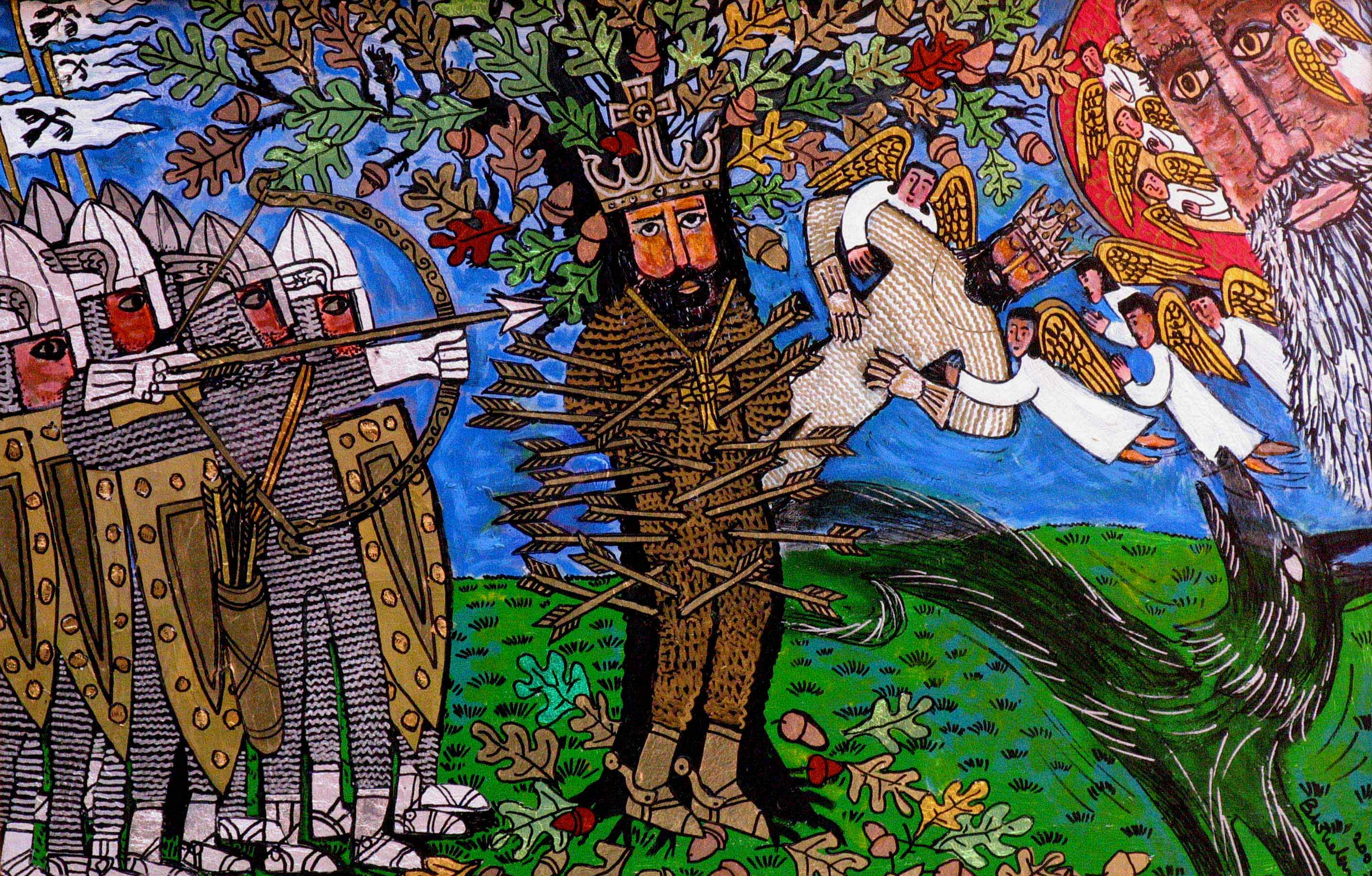
Brian Whelan – The Martyrdom of St Edmund, St Edmundsbury Cathedral

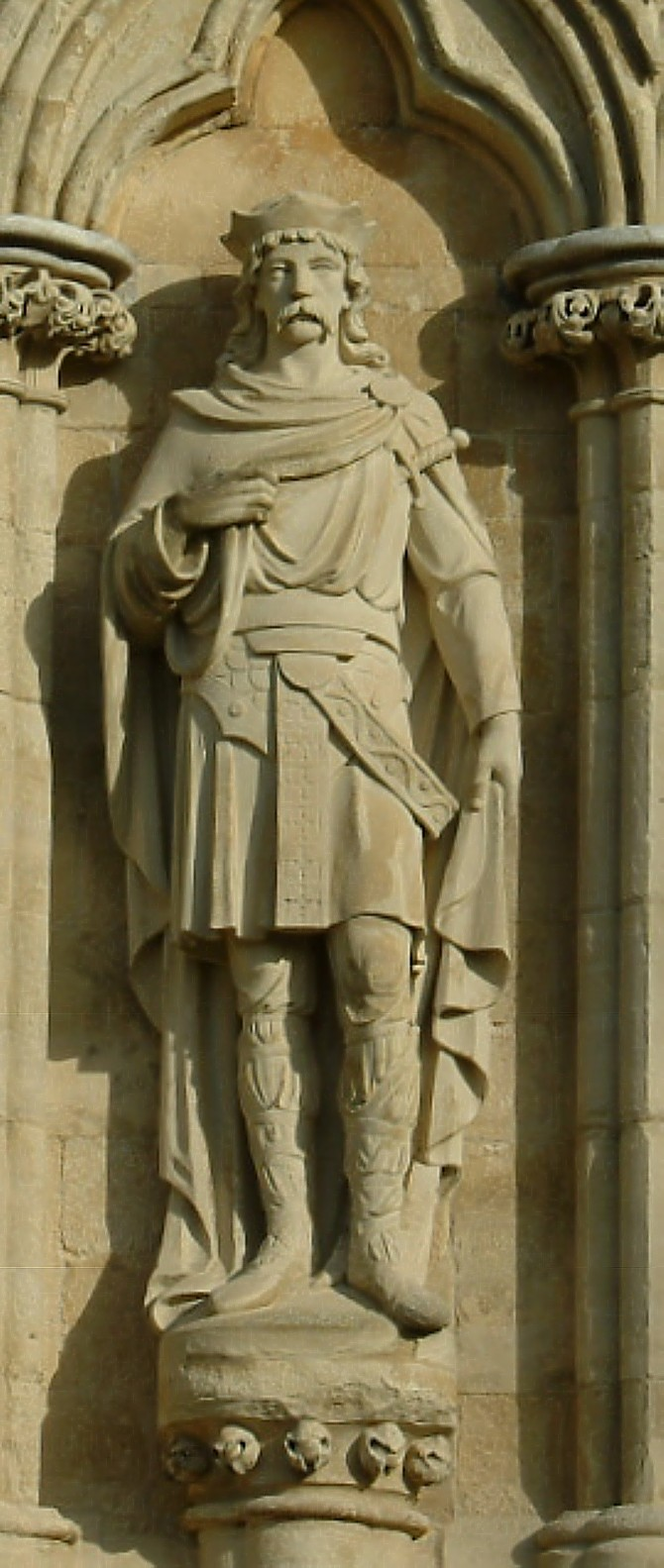
Statue, Salisbury Cathedral

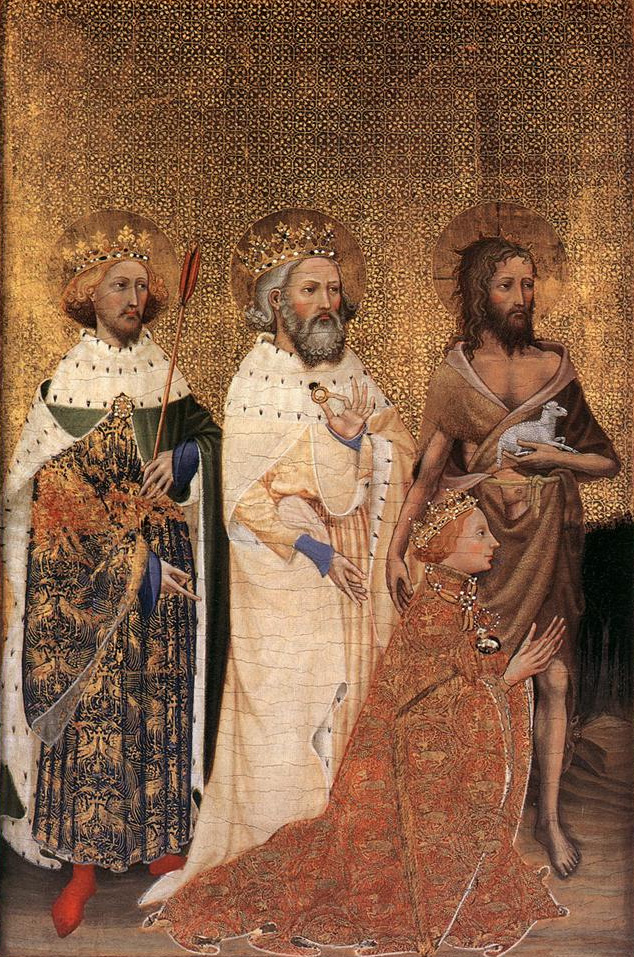
The Wilton Diptych

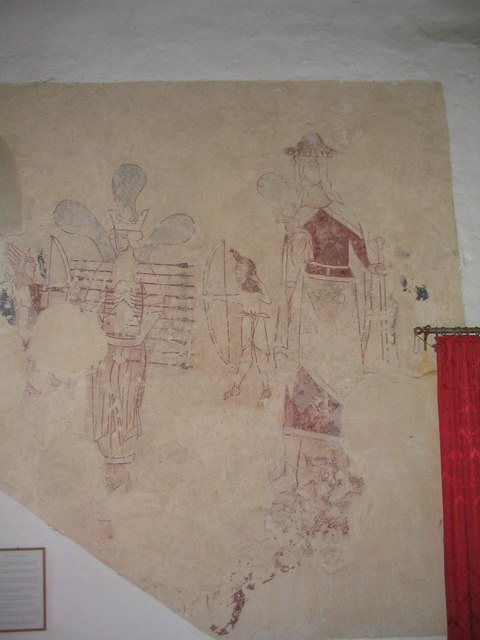
Edmund's martyrdom on a wall painting at St Andrew's Church, Stoke Dry, Rutland

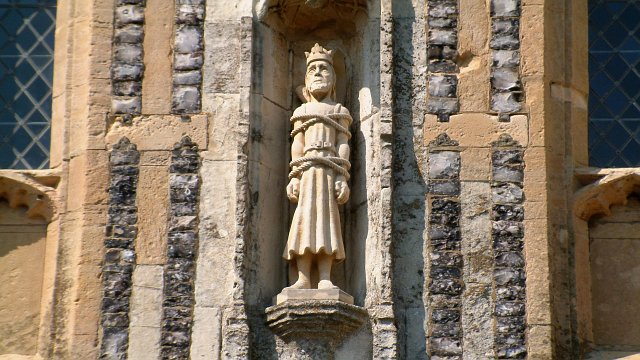
A statue of the saint outside St Edmund's Church, Southwold.

The saint features in a romantic poem, Athelston, whose 15th-century author is unknown. In the climactic scene of the poem, Edyff, the sister of King 'Athelston' of England, gives birth to Edmund after passing through a ritual ordeal by fire.

== See also ==
- List of Catholic saints
- Ragener – reputedly a relative of St Edmund, who shared in his martyrdom.

== Sources ==
- Abels, Richard (1998). Alfred the Great: War, Kingship and Culture in Anglo-Saxon England. Harlow, Essex: Longman. ISBN 978-0-582-04047-2.
- Ball, Ann (2003). The Encyclopaedia of Catholic Devotion and Practices. Huntingdon, US: Our Sunday Visitor Inc. ISBN 978-0-87973-910-2. Archived from the original on 12 May 2016.
- Butler, Alban; Thomas, Sarah Fawcett; Burns, Paul (1997). Butler's Lives of the Saints. Collegeville: The Liturgical Press. ISBN 978-0-8146-2387-9.
- Cantor, Leonard, ed. (1982). The English Medieval Landscape. London: Croom Helm. ISBN 978-0-7099-0707-7.
- Costambeys, Marios (2008). "Guthrum". Oxford Dictionary of National Biography (online ed.). Oxford University Press. doi:10.1093/ref:odnb/11793. (Subscription, Wikipedia Library access or UK public library membership required.)
- Farmer, David Hugh (2011). The Oxford Dictionary of Saints (5th revised ed.). Oxford, UK: Oxford University Press. ISBN 978-0-19-959660-7.
- Field, Rosalind; Brewer, Derek (2010). Christianity and Romance in Medieval England. Christianity and Culture. Woodbridge: Brewer. ISBN 978-1-84384-219-4.
- Frantzen, Allen J. (2004). Bloody Good: Chivalry, Sacrifice, and the Great War. Chicago: University of Chicago Press. ISBN 978-0-226-26085-3.
- Gem, Richard (2020). "A Scientific Examination of the Relics of St Edmund at Arundel Castle". In Gransden, Antonia (ed.). Bury St Edmunds: Medieval Art, Architecture, Archaeology and Economy. British Archaeological Association. pp. 45–59. ISBN 978-09012-8-687-1.
- Gransden, Antonia (1992). Legends, Traditions and History in Medieval England. London; Rio Grande: Hambleton Press. ISBN 978-1-85285-016-6.
- Gransden, Antonia (2004). "Edmund [St Edmund] (d. 869)". Oxford Dictionary of National Biography. Oxford University Press. doi:10.1093/ref:odnb/8500. ISBN 978-0-19-861412-8. (subscription, Wikipedia Library access or UK public library membership required)
- Grierson, Philip; Blackburn, Mark (1986). Medieval European Coinage 1. The Early Middle Ages (5th–10th centuries). Cambridge, New York: Cambridge University Press. ISBN 978-0-521-26009-1.
- Houghton, Bryan (1970). Saint Edmund King and Martyr. Lavenham & Sudbury, Suffolk: Terence Dalton Limited. ISBN 978-0-900963-18-6.
- Phillips, George Edward (1909). "St. Edmund the Martyr" . In Herbermann, Charles (ed.). Catholic Encyclopedia. Vol. 5. New York: Robert Appleton Company.
- Julien, Pascal (1996). "A Design by Jean Chalette for the Silver Reliquary of St. Edmund". Master Drawings. 34 (4). Master Drawings Association: 418–420. JSTOR 1554276.
- Lawson, M. K. (2013). "Cnut [Canute] (d. 1035)". Oxford Dictionary of National Biography (online ed.). Oxford University Press. doi:10.1093/ref:odnb/4579. (Subscription, Wikipedia Library access or UK public library membership required.)
- Licence, Tom, ed. (2014). Herman the Archdeacon and Goscelin of Saint-Bertin: Miracles of St Edmund (in Latin and English). Oxford, UK: Clarendon Press. ISBN 978-0-19-968919-4.
- Olderr, Steven (2012). Symbolism: A Comprehensive Dictionary (2nd ed.). Jefferson, North Carolina; London: McFarland and Company Inc. ISBN 978-07864-9-067-7.
- Oliver, Neil (2013). The Vikings. New York: Pegasus Books. ISBN 978-16059-8-483-4.
- Pinner, Rebecca (2015). The Cult of St Edmund in Medieval East Anglia. Woodbridge, Suffolk: Boydell Press. ISBN 978-17832-7-035-4.
- Preble, George Henry (1917). Origin and History of the American Flag and of the Naval and Yacht-Club Signals, Seals and Arms, and Principal National Songs of the United States, with a Chronicle of the Symbols, Standards, Banners, and Flags of Ancient and Modern Nations. Philadelphia: N. L. Brown. OCLC 834673566.
- Redstone, Lilian J. (1914). "The Liberty of St. Edmund" (PDF). Proceedings of the Suffolk Institute of Archaeology & History. 15 (part 2). Suffolk Institute of Archaeology & History: 200–211. ISSN 0262-6004.
- Reimer, Stephen R. (2004). "Unbinding Lydgate's Lives of Ss. Edmund and Fremund". In Echard, Siân; Partridge, Stephen Bradford (eds.). The Book Unbound: Editing and Reading Medieval Manuscripts and Texts. Toronto: University of Toronto Press. ISBN 978-08020-8-756-0.
- Ridyard, Susan J. (1988). The Royal Saints of Anglo-Saxon England: a Study of West Saxon & East Anglian Cults. Cambridge: Cambridge University Press. ISBN 978-0-521-30772-7.
- Swanton, Michael (1997). The Anglo-Saxon Chronicle. London: Routledge. ISBN 978-0-415-92129-9.
- Waller, Philip (2000). The English Urban Landscape. Oxford New York: Oxford University Press. ISBN 978-01986-0-117-3.
- Warner, Peter (1996). The Origins of Suffolk. Manchester and New York: Manchester University Press. ISBN 978-0-7190-3817-4.
- Westwood, Jennifer (1986). Albion: A Guide to Legendary Britain. HarperCollins Canada, Limited. ISBN 978-0-246-11789-2.
- Whitelock, Dorothy, ed. (1979). English Historical Documents, Volume 1, c. 500–1042 (2nd ed.). London: Routledge. ISBN 978-0-415-14366-0.
- Yates, Richard (1843). History and Antiquities of the Abbey of St. Edmund's Bury (2nd ed.). J.B. Nichols and Son. OCLC 1153377679.
- Young, Francis (2018). Edmund: In Search of England's Lost King. London: Bloomsbury. ISBN 978-17867-3-361-0.
- Yorke, Barbara (2002). Kings and Kingdoms of Early Anglo-Saxon England. London and New York: Routledge. ISBN 978-0-415-16639-3.
- Yorke, Barbara (1995). Wessex in the Early Middle Ages. New York: Leicester University Press. ISBN 978-0-7185-1314-6.

English royalty
Preceded by Æthelweard	King of East Anglia; 25 December 855 (trad.) – 20 November 869	Succeeded by Oswald
