= Isabel Jordayne =

English abbess

- Died: 1534
- Occupation: Abbess of Wilton Abbey

Isabel Jordayne (died c.1534) was an English abbess of Wilton Abbey. She was the penultimate abbess whose election was debated by Cardinal Wolsey and Anne Boleyn before Henry VIII, the abbey's patron, chose her.

== Life ==
Jordayne's birth and early life are not known. Her sister, Agnes Jordan, was the abbess at Syon Monastery and Isabel was well respected as a nun at Wilton Abbey who was "ancient, wise and discreet".

The abbess of Wilton Abbey, Cecily Willoughby, died on 24 September 1528, and Jordayne was the heir apparent and her name was put forward to Cardinal Wolsey. The job vacancy came in difficult times, as thirty convents had been closed and converted to supplying education. The wealthy Wilton Abbey was not an obvious candidate for closure, as it was a royal foundation, although with Henry VIII as patron the abbey was obliged to supply favours at the monarch's request. The abbey nominated the election of the prioress, Isabel Jordayne, described as 'ancient, wise and discreet', while Anne Boleyn favored her brother-in-law William Carey's sister Eleanor Carey.

Henry VIII eventually agreed to Jordayne when Eleanor Carey's candidacy was destroyed by serious charges of immorality against her. One source says that it was Wolsey who appointed Jordayne. Eleanor Carey admitted that she had given birth to two children fathered by priests. Eleanor's elder sister, who was a nun at Wilton, was also a contender, but she was rejected too. Although Isabel won the appointment, she was deprived of control of the abbey's finances until November 1528, and the abbey's reputation was damaged by the scandal surrounding its potential leaders. The abbey was then visited by the plague, there was a fire in one of the dormitories, and Jordayne struggled to bring the nuns into line with discipline. The bishop of Salisbury's vicar-general, Richard Hilley, also tried to impose order amongst the nuns in 1533.

It is not clear when Jordayne died, but her position was said to be vacant in 1533. Cecily Bodenham a new abbess was appointed and she was the last of Wilton Abbey's abbesses. She had paid to be named abbess.
