= Eve of Wilton =

11th/12th-century Benedictine anchoress and writer

- Born: c. 1058
- Died: c. 1125

Eve of Wilton (c. 1058 – c. 1125) was a Benedictine nun and anchoress. She was given to Wilton Abbey as a child and later moved to Normandy to be a recluse.

== Life ==
Eve was born around 1058. Her father was Danish and her mother was a Lotharingian. In 1065, the year before Edward the Confessor died and the Norman Conquest, her parents gave her (aged seven) to Wilton Abbey. The Abbey had been rebuilt in stone due to the Royal patronage of Edith of Wessex. Goscelin of Canterbury was one of her mentors and he kept in contact with her after she left the abbey in 1080, even though he complained about not being consulted. Eve had decided to move to France to live as a recluse at Angers, and after near Chalonnes-sur-Loire.

Eve living as recluse in France with Hervé, mentioned by Hilarius in "Versus & Ludi - Eve virginis Epicedium".

Goscelin, who had become an itinerant hagiographer, wrote a book addressed to Eve titled Liber confortatorius (Book of Consolation). This was an unusual book as it was addressed alone to Eve and the book advises anyone who finds it to return it to Eve. One commentator feels that it reads like a private, even erotic, letter.

She lived as an anchorite in a small cell with one window. Through the window were passed books including the Confessions of Augustine and his City of God. She read histories and the Consolation of Philosophy by Boethius.

Anchorites live in their cell until they died, but Eve left her cell and went to live with a former monk named Hervey. This raised some eyebrows but commentators saw their life together as worthy. Geoffrey, abbot of Vendôme, wrote to them in 1002 giving them his approval.

== Death and legacy ==
Eve died in about 1125. A hagiographic poem of her life was written by the poet Hilary.
