= Ragener =

Anglo-Saxon Saint

Saint Ragener (also Ragner) (died 20 November 869) was, according to medieval documentary sources, a Christian martyr who died at the hands of the Vikings alongside his uncle Edmund the Martyr.

He was buried at St Peter's Church, Northampton. His relics and shrine were destroyed during the Reformation, but the lid of his stone coffin is still displayed at the end of the south aisle.
