= Cecily Bodenham =

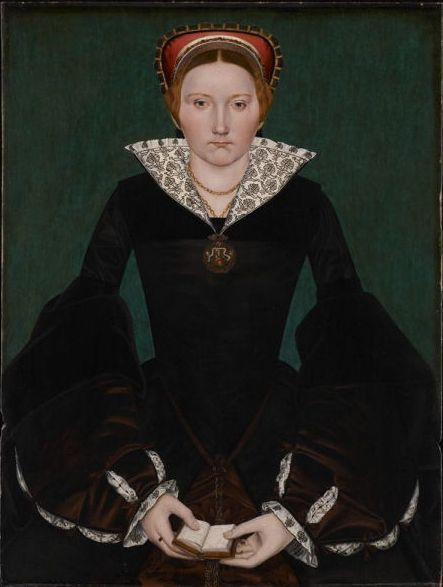
- Portrait alleged to be of Cecily Bodenham
- Born: before 1511; Rotherwas, Herefordshire, England
- Died: after 1543
- Title: Prioress of Kingston St Michael; Abbess of Wilton Abbey
- Parent(s): Roger Bodenham; Joane Bromwich

Cecily Bodenham (before 1511 – after 1543) was the last abbess of Wilton Abbey. Her tenure as abbess was from 1534 to 25 March 1539, when she surrendered the abbey to the commissioners of King Henry VIII of England during the Dissolution of the Monasteries. She received a generous pension and a property at Fovant, where she retired with about ten of the nuns from Wilton.

== Religious career ==
Cecily was born on an unknown date, the daughter of Roger Bodenham of Rotherwas, Herefordshire and Joane Bromwich. She became a nun at Kingston St Michael in Wiltshire; eventually becoming the Prioress. In 1511, she was kidnapped by a curate of Castle Coombe, who also robbed the priory. However, she was later released and returned to Kingston St Michael. In 1534, she was nominated by the Court to the vacant post of abbess of Wilton Abbey, replacing Isabel Jordayne. Cecily was known to both King Henry and Queen Anne Boleyn; and she paid the sum of £100 to Thomas Cromwell to secure her election as abbess.

As abbess of Wilton, Cecily held an entire barony from the king, which was a privilege shared by three other English nunneries: Shaftesbury, Barking and St. Mary, Winchester.

During her tenure, she leased Fuggleston Manor, held by Wilton Abbey, to a relative, Henry Bodenham. She was compliant with the King's policies during the Dissolution of the Monasteries; and when Wilton Abbey suffered the same fate as the other religious houses, she willingly surrendered the abbey to the King's commissioners on 25 March 1539. At the time she claimed to be "without father, brother, or assured friend".

A nun at the abbey wrote in her diary complaining of Cecily Bodenham's ready acquiescence to King Henry's Acts with this passage:

"Methinks the Abbess hath a faint heart and doth yield up our possessions to the spoiler with a not unwilling haste...Master Richard Neville, the Sub-Seneschal, informeth me that His Majesty's commissioners do purpose to reward her with a fair house at Foffaunt and a goodly stipend withal."

Cecily was amply awarded with a generous pension of £100 and a property at Fovant in Wiltshire, with an orchard, gardens, three acres of meadow and one load of wood per annum from Fovant Woods. About ten of the nuns from Wilton went to live with her at the Manor Home Farm. She paid for the construction of the south aisle of St. George's Church.

Cecily Bodenham died sometime after 1543, when her will was made.

== Portrait ==
According to author Elizabeth Dorsey Hatle in her Portrait of a Young Woman, published by Ricardian Register in 2003, the subject of the portrait at the Minneapolis Institute of Art is Cecily Bodenham.

== Notes ==
Religious titles
Preceded by Isabel Jordan	Abbess of Wilton Abbey; 1534-1539	Dissolved
