= Geoffrey of Wells =

Geoffrey of Wells (Galfridius Fontibus) (Note: Another Galfridus Fontibus was Geoffrey of Fontaines-les-Blanches: see Giles Constable, "Religious communities, 1024-1215", in David Luscombe (ed.), The New Cambridge Medieval History (Cambridge University Press) 2004:364.) was a mid-12th-century English hagiographer and a canon of Wells Cathedral, whose De Infantia Sancti Edmundi ("The infancy of Saint Edmund"), part of the burgeoning library of 12th-century legendaries concerning Saint Edmund, accounted the royal saint's childhood to have been full of adventure. (Note: For parallel apocryphal literature, see Infancy gospels.) He dedicated his "largely spurious account" to Ording, eighth abbot of Bury St. Edmunds, and spoke of the encouragement of another well-placed Anglo-Saxon, Prior Sihtric. The manuscript of Geoffrey's pious embroidery was among the manuscripts collected by the early 17th-century antiquary Robert Bruce Cotton, now conserved in the British Library in London.
