= Wilton Abbey =

Benedictine women's monastery in Wiltshire, England

Coordinates: 51.0781°N 1.8560°W

- Interactive map of Wilton Abbey

Monastery information
- Order: Benedictine
- Established: Early 10th century
- Disestablished: 1539

Site
- Location: Wiltshire, England, 3 mi (5 km) from Salisbury

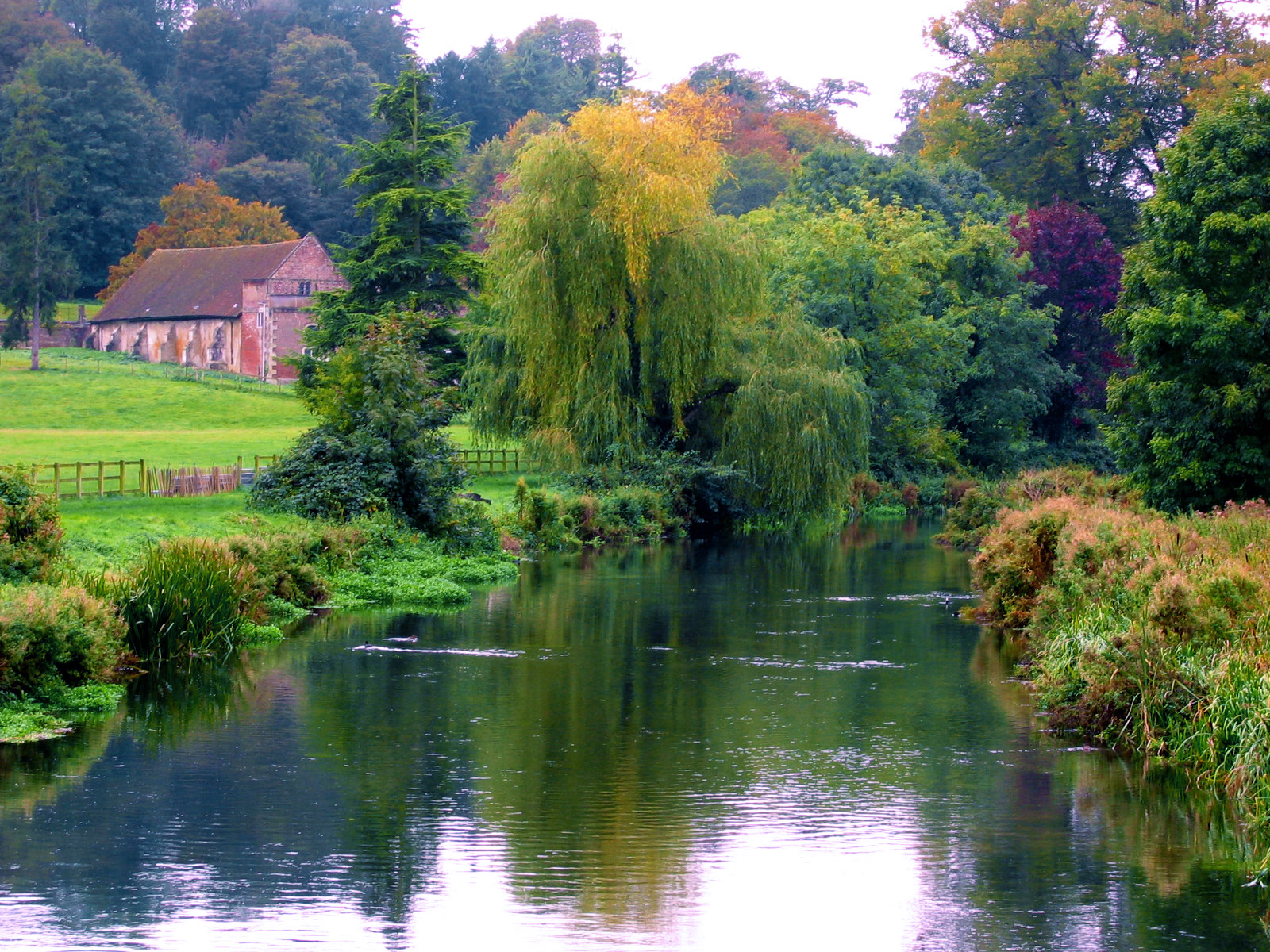
Part of the gardens of Wilton House

Wilton Abbey was a Benedictine convent in Wiltshire, England, three miles west of Salisbury, probably on the site now occupied by Wilton House. It was active from the early tenth century until 1539.

== History ==
=== Foundation ===
Wilton Abbey is first recorded in the 930s, but a 15th-century poem dates its foundation in the late 8th century by Weohstan, ealdorman of Wiltshire, and says that his widow Alburga was its abbess. This claim has been accepted by some historians, but it is rejected by the ecclesiastical historian, Sarah Foot, who describes the abbey as a new foundation of the 10th century. The story is also dismissed by the historian Elizabeth Crittall. Alburga (or Æthelburh) is said to have been the half-sister of King Ecgberht of Wessex, but she is not mentioned in biographies of Ecgberht.

=== Anglo Saxon era ===
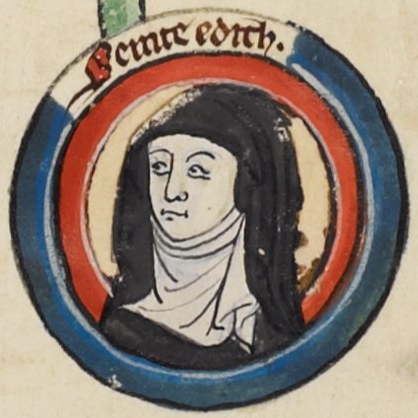
Near-contemporary drawing of Edith

The community was to number 26 nuns. It was attached to St Mary's Church. Two daughters of King Edward the Elder and his wife Ælfflæd, Eadflæd and Æthelhild, probably joined the community, Eadflæd as a nun and Æthelhild as a lay sister. They were buried at Wilton with their mother. Their half-brother king Æthelstan, made two grants of land to a congregation at Wilton in the 930s, including one in 937 for the remission of his sins and those of Eadflæd.

In 955, King Eadwig granted the nuns of Wilton Abbey an estate called Chelke (Chalke, Saxon æt Ceolcum) which included land in Broad Chalke and Bowerchalke.

=== Wulfthryth era ===
Wulfthryth of Wilton, the wife (or concubine) of Edgar, King of the English (reigned 959–975), was abbess of Wilton from the early 960s until about 1000. According to Stenton, she was a nun when Edgar, who could not have been more than sixteen at the time, and she a bit older, abducted her from the abbey and carried her off to his palace at Kemsing, near Sevenoaks. Bride Abduction was not uncommon in pre-Christian and early Christian Anglo-Saxon society, and it is unknown to what extent she consented. She was held at Kemsing for two years, during which time she bore Edgar a daughter Saint Edith, whom he acknowledged and supported for the rest of his life. Saint Dunstan, an advisor to Edgar, later talked the king into doing penance for the abduction, and Edgar reportedly refrained from wearing his crown for seven years.

By the early 960's, Wulfthryth was installed as abbess at Wilton (where she raised her daughter), and Edgar had bestowed the abbey with treasure and land. In 964 Edgar married Ælfthryth in a Christian ceremony which would have nullified any pagan arrangement with Wulfthryth. Because of this, modern historians sometimes refer to her as a "concubine" but the word is inaccurate, given the custom of the time. Having been given wealth by the king, and being of a noble background herself, Wulfthryth used her wealth to build up Wilton's relic collection. She was also able to use her royal connections to protect Wilton in other ways, such as securing the release of two Wilton priests who had been imprisoned by the reeve of Wilton.

Her daughter died between 984 and 987 at the age of 23, and her mother and various royalty, as well as enormous local popular support, promoted her cult as a saint.

=== High middle ages ===
In 1003, Sweyn, King of Denmark, destroyed the town of Wilton but it is unknown whether the abbey shared its fate. Edith of Wessex, the wife of Edward the Confessor, who had been educated at Wilton, rebuilt the abbey in stone; it had previously been built of wood.

In 1065, the year before the Norman conquest, a couple gave their daughter Eve of Wilton to the abbey. She left in 1080 to have a notable life in France.

The Abbess of Wilton held an entire barony from the king, a privilege shared by only three other English nunneries, Shaftesbury, Barking, and St Mary's Abbey, Winchester. As the head of a barony, the abbess had the obligation to provide the royal army with knights when summoned. The abbess had the privilege to appoint offices in her realm, which made her an important patron; her most prestigious cause of patronage was her right to appoint deacon to the conventual church, which had a great deal of clergymen in office at any given time.

Wilton Abbey was favoured by the royal family and given many rich donations from members of the royal family, such as from Henry I and Queen Maud. The king, the Archbishop of Canterbury, the Bishop of Salisbury, and sometimes the queen, had the right to nominate nuns to Wilton, and the king exercised this right on his coronation and on the creation of a new abbess, and the queen on her coronation.

In 1143 King Stephen made it his headquarters, but was put to flight by Matilda's forces under Robert, Earl of Gloucester.

During the 13th-century, Wilton Abbey experienced a period of financial crisis, and between 1246 and 1276, several gifts were made from the crown and the church for the repair of the buildings, which were at this point described as having fallen into a serious state of disrepair.

Several scandals are known to have occurred in Wilton Abbey. In 1284 and 1302 nuns of Wilton were found guilty of misconduct, and again in 1379.

In 1528, the crown interfered in the election of a new abbess after the death of Cecily Willoughby. The abbey nominated the election of the prioress, Isabel Jordayne, described as 'ancient, wise and discreet', while Anne Boleyn favoured her brother-in-law William Carey's sister Eleanor Carey. Henry VIII preferred Isabel Jordayne when Eleanor Carey's candidacy was destroyed by serious moral charges against her. In 1535, the abbess complained about Thomas Leigh's too strictly enforced enclosure, as it would not be possible for her to conduct the abbey's business properly if she was not allowed to leave the convent on business, as the abbey was in debt.

=== Dissolution ===
Cecily Bodenham, the last abbess, surrendered the convent to the commissioners of King Henry VIII on 25 March 1539 during the Dissolution of the Monasteries. The site was granted to Sir William Herbert, afterwards Earl of Pembroke, who commenced the building of Wilton House, still the abode of his descendants. There are no remains of the ancient buildings.

== Abbesses of Wilton ==
- Ælfgyth, occurs 955.
- Wulfthryth of Wilton, died 1000.
- Bryghtwyde, occurs 1065 (said to be third abbess after Wulfthryth).
- Alfyne, succeeds Bryghtwyde 1065, died 1067.
- Hawise, occurs temp. Henry II.
- Alice, occurs 1192.
- Mary, occurs 1194.
- Asceline, occurs 1197, 1208.
- Margaret, died before 12 February 1222.
- Isabel de Warenne, elected 1222, died before 1 April 1228.
- Alice, elected 1228, died before 7 May 1237.
- Alice, elected 1237, died before 29 August 1252.
- Maud de la Mare, elected 1252, died before 2 November 1271.
- Juliana Gifford, elected between 27 December 1271 and 16 November 1272, died before 6 July 1296.
- Parnel de Vaux, elected 1296, died before 8 May 1299.
- Emma Blount, elected 1299, died before 20 Nov. 1321.
- Constance de Percy, elected 1321, died before 14 August 1344.
- Robergia de Popham, elected 1344, died before 4 May 1346.
- Lucy Loveny, 1346, died before 30 October 1361.
- Sibyl Aucher, elected 1361, died before 20 June 1374.
- Maud de Bokeland, elected 1374, died before 12 October 1395.
- Felise Lavington, elected 1395.
- Joan Beauchamp, elected 1403, died before 19 November 1416.
- Christine Doulre, elected 1416, died 1441.
- Christine Codford, elected 1441, died 1448.
- Isabel Lambard, elected 1448, died 1464.
- Edith Barough, elected 1464, died before 11 December 1470.
- Alice Comelonde, elected 1471, died 1485.
- Cecily Willoughby, elected 24 September 1485, died on 24 April 1528.
- Isabel Jordayne, elected 1528; on 28 March 1533 abbey said to have been long without an abbess.
- Cecily Bodenham, elected 1534.

== Burials ==
- Saint Iwig or Iwi (died c. 690)
- Edith of Wilton (c. 963 – c. 986) patron saint of Wilton
- Saint Wulfthryth (died 988), mother of St. Edith of Wilton
- Ælfflæd, Eadflæd and Æthelhild
