= Oswald of East Anglia =

King of the East Angles from 870 to 875

Oswald

King of the East Angles
- Reign: 20 November 869 – 875
- Predecessor: Edmund the Martyr
- Successor: Æthelred II

Oswald was king of East Anglia, present-day England in the 870s after the death of Edmund the Martyr. Very little is known about his life aside from coins minted during his reign.

== Rule ==
Evidence suggests that during the period between the death of Edmund and the return of Guthrum to East Anglia in 880, Oswald and Æthelred ruled the East Angles as client kings. It is possible that the East Anglian aristocracy had been almost, but not entirely, extinguished by the Viking attacks that resulted in Edmund's death, and that in the years when Oswald, Æthelred and Guthrum successively ruled the kingdom, there was a period of opposition or defiance against the Danish leadership. The Vikings ruled the East Angles from the accession of Oswald until 920, when East Anglia was incorporated into the kingdom of England, following the defeat of the Danes by Edward the Elder.

== Coinage ==
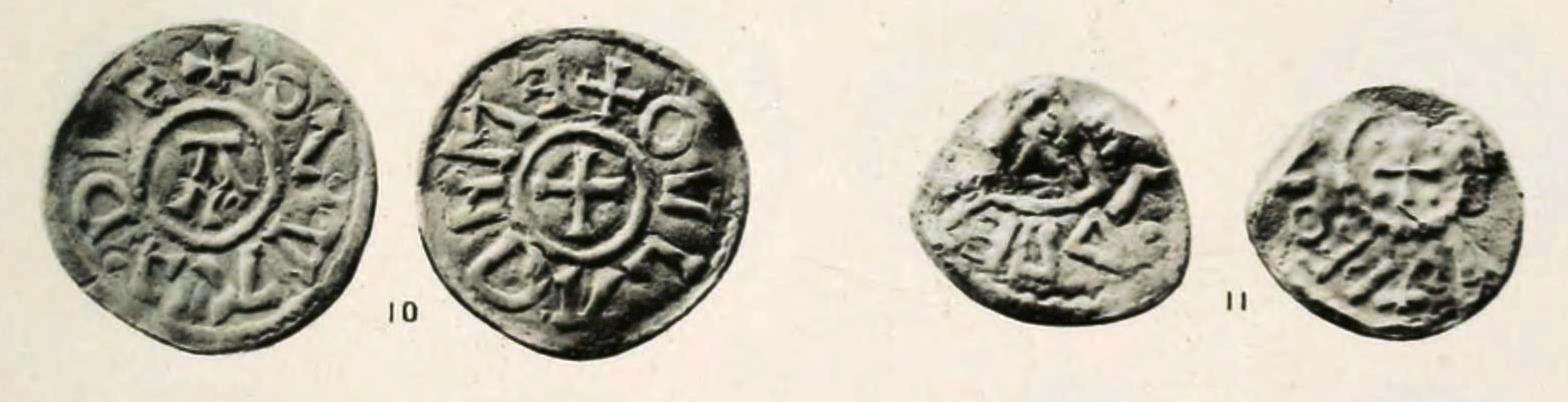
Two coins of Oswald, now in the British Museum

The existence of Oswald is known solely because of his coins. Coins and silver bullion were used throughout this period, when the Vikings continued the Anglo-Saxon tradition of producing silver pennies, although at a reduced rate. Eight coins are known from the reigns of Æthelred and Oswald, whereas over 200 coins are known to have been made by the moneyers of Oswald's predecessor, Edmund.

A few coins bearing Oswald's name were found in the Cuerdale Hoard. The coins can be dated from the 870s to the 900s, following the death of Edmund. One coin, produced by a moneyer whose name started Beor..., is of the temple type; another has an alpha, a common East Anglian design.

== Sources ==
- Bates, David; Liddiard, Robert (2015). East Anglia and its North Sea World in the Middle Ages. Martlesham: The Boydell Press. ISBN 978-17832-7-036-1.
- Blackburn, Mark; Grierson, Philip (1986). Mediaeval European Coinage: Volume 1 The Early Middle Ages (5th-10th Centuries). Cambridge: Cambridge University Press.
- Lapidge, M.; et al., eds. (1999). "Kings of the East Angles". The Blackwell Encyclopedia of Anglo-Saxon England. London: Blackwell. pp. 508–509. ISBN 978-0-6312-2492-1.
- Pestell, Tim (2004). Landscapes of Monastic Foundation: The Establishment of Religious Houses c.650–1200. Woodbridge: Boydell Press. ISBN 1-84383-062-0.

English royalty
Preceded by Edmund the Martyr	King of East Anglia	Succeeded by Æthelred II
