= Oxford Dictionary of Saints =

Reference work on saints by David Hugh Farmer

- First edition of the Oxford Dictionary of Saints
- Author: David Hugh Farmer
- Language: English
- Series: Oxford Paperback Reference
- Genre: Reference
- Publisher: Oxford University Press all editions
- Publication date: 1st 1978; 5th Revised 2011
- Media type: Print (hardback & paperback)
- Pages: 462 (Hardback edition); 608 (5th, Paperback edition)
- ISBN: 978-0199596607

The Oxford Dictionary of Saints by David Hugh Farmer is a concise reference compilation of information on more than 1300 saints and contains over 1700 entries. It is published by Oxford University Press. The first edition was published in 1978. A fifth revised edition was published in 2011.
