= St Mary's Church, Wilton =

St Mary's Church
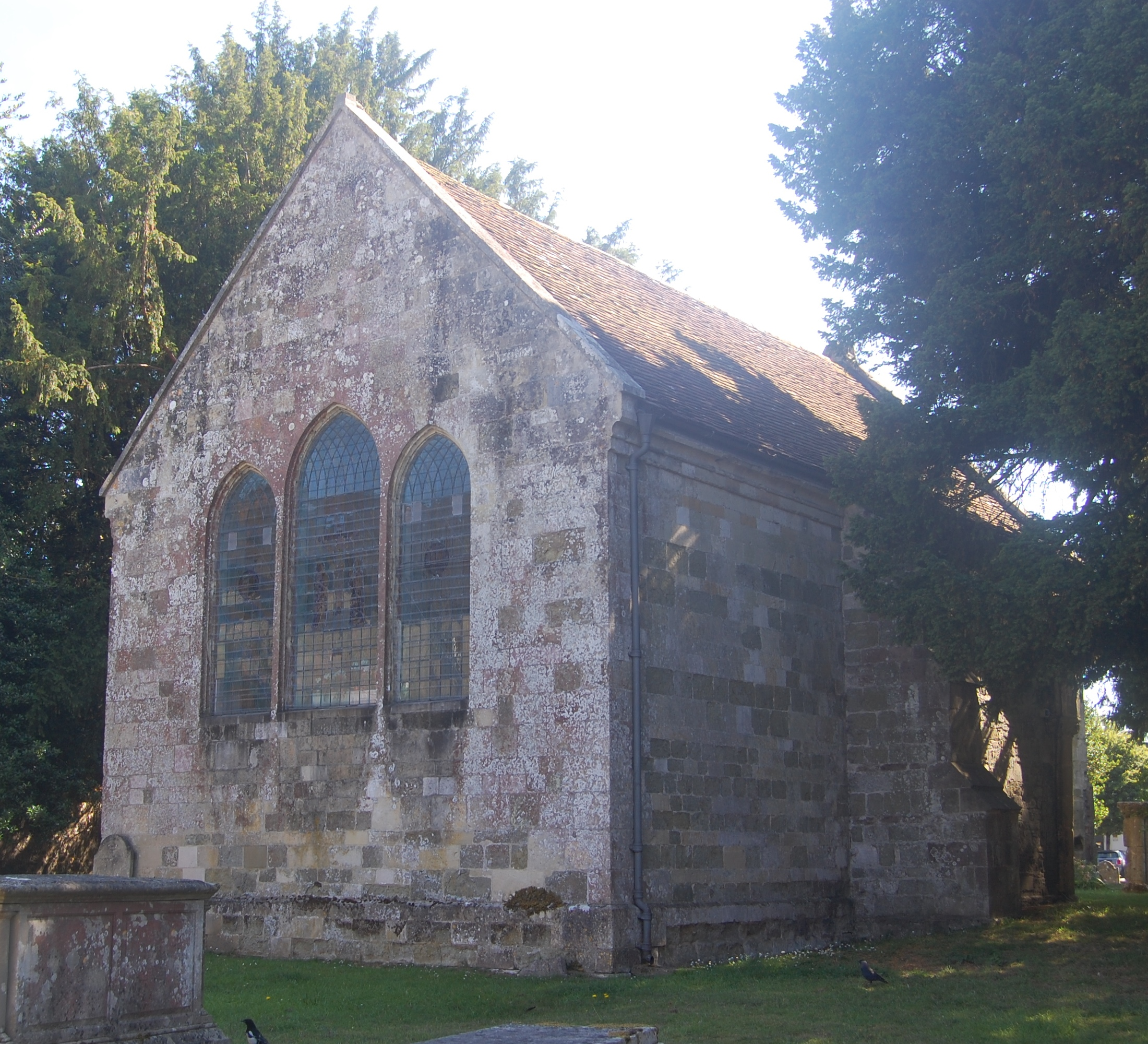
- St Mary's Church in July 2022

- Location within Wiltshire
- 51°04′47″N 1°51′48″W
- Location: Wilton, Wiltshire, England

History
- Built: 15th century

Listed Building – Grade II*
- Official name: Church of St Mary
- Designated: 4 August 1951
- Reference no.: 1355781

St Mary's Church in the Market Place of Wilton, Wiltshire, England, was built in the 15th century. It is recorded in the National Heritage List for England as a Grade II* listed building, and is now a redundant church in the care of the Churches Conservation Trust.

St Mary's was built on the site of an earlier church at which Bishop Robert de Bingham was consecrated in 1229 before the completion of his cathedral church at Salisbury; his statue is still visible on the west gable. By the 9th century the Benedictine convent of Wilton Abbey was attached to the church. During the 14th and 15th centuries other medieval churches in Wilton closed and combined with St Mary's which was rebuilt and expanded to become, by the 16th century, the sole parish church. In 1441 parish records include the purchase of a great bell and c. 1628 a carved pulpit was installed. In the early 19th century a parish rate was levied for the restoration of the church and a chandelier and pulpit sconces were bought to enable evening services.

In 1845 a new Church of England parish church of St Mary and St Nicholas was built at the instigation of the Countess of Pembroke and her younger son Baron Herbert of Lea, designed by the architect Thomas Henry Wyatt and D. Brandon in the Italianate Romanesque style, with considerable Byzantine influences. The bells and many memorials from the old church were transferred to the new.

As a result, the old church was partially demolished, apart from the chancel and one bay of the nave. The ruins consist of the three arches of the south arcade, fragments of the north arcade and the altered eastern arch of the west tower or west window within the churchyard.

Restoration was undertaken between 1933 and 1939 by Robert Worth Bingham, the United States Ambassador to the United Kingdom from 1933 to 1937, who claimed descent from Robert de Bingham. The church was declared redundant on 30 May 1972, and was vested in the Trust on 15 November 1977.

== See also ==
- List of churches preserved by the Churches Conservation Trust in Southwest England
