= On the Resting-Places of the Saints =

Secgan
- On the Resting-Places of the Saints
- Full title: The account of God's saints who first rested in England
- Language: Old English
- Date: mid-11th century
- Authenticity: reliable
- British Library: Stowe MS 944, ff 34v-39r
- Parker Library, Corpus Christi College, Cambridge No. 201, pp. 147–151
- (A third copy, Cotton Vitellius D. xvii, was destroyed by a fire of 1731)
- Latin version ('V' text): London, British Library, Cotton Vitellius A 2 ff 3-5
- First printed edition: Liebermann, Felix (1889). Die Heiligen Englands: Angelsächsisch und Lateinisch (in German). Hanover.
- Period covered: Anglo-Saxon England

On the Resting-Places of the Saints is a heading given to two early medieval pieces of writing, also known as Þá hálgan and the Secgan, which exist in various manuscript forms in both Old English and Latin, the earliest surviving manuscripts of which date to the mid-11th century. Secgan is so named from its Old English incipit, Secgan be þam Godes sanctum þe on Engla lande aerost reston "Tale of God's saints who first rested in England"), and is a list of fifty places which had shrines and remains of Anglo-Saxon saints. Þá hálgan (pronounced thar halgan) is a version of the so-called Kentish Royal Legend (its incipit Her cyð ymbe þa halgan þe on Angelcynne restað "Here [follows] a relation on the saints who rest in the English nation") is a heading which appears to be for both texts, as the Kentish legend, which comes first, is actually an account of how various members of the royal family of Kent, descendants of Æthelberht of Kent, founded monasteries and came to be regarded as saints. As such it is closer to other hagiographical texts than to the list of burial sites that follows it. The texts describe people living from the 7th to 10th centuries, and they exist in both Old English and Latin versions, but both have their earliest known manuscripts dating from the 11th century.

== The Manuscripts ==
The two texts now known as 'Þá hálgan' and 'Secgan' are known from two extant manuscripts written in Old English, that were transcribed in the 11th century. The manuscript known as Stowe MS 944, (folia 29v-39r), the older of the two, is thought to have been written shortly after 1031. Rollason (1978) argues that the scribe was including material dating to as early as the mid 9th century (for example the reference to Ubbanford).

Stowe MS 944 is a bound volume now in the British Library, the full scanned images of which are at British Library Online. It begins with a history of Hyde Abbey, Winchester, written in 1771, followed by a wide collection of much older original source documents. A selection of medieval drawings, is followed by a Liber vitae, written in 1031 consisting of lists of names of brethren and benefactors of the New Minster, also at Winchester, and substantially annotated. Other historiographical texts follow, including the will of King Ælfred. The two documents being considered here, originally composed entirely separately, were then written into the same Old English manuscript, under a combined heading of 'On the Resting-Places of the Saints'. However, it is the second document ('Secgan') which provided the list of saints. The first, ('Þá hálgan') includes mention of many saints, particularly those relating to Kent, but written as part of a narrative of the Kentish Royal Legend.

Her Cyðymbe þa halgan þe on Angel cynne restað: a treatise on the family of the Kentish kings, their holy character and works (ff. 34v-36v).
Her onygynð secgean be þam Godes s[an]c[tu]m þe on engla lande ærest reston: a treatise, in continuation of the preceding, showing the places, with their adjacent waters, in England, and one place in Ireland, where the Saints' remains are deposited (ff. 36v-39r).

CCCC 201: The two documents are found in substantially the same (but not identical) form in the Parker Library, Corpus Christi College, Cambridge (CCCC 201, pp. 149–151). CCCC 201 is a substantial 3-volume set of manuscripts, with 96 constituent pieces of writing, in various 'hands' (different people's handwriting). Mostly written in Old English, it begins with Homilies of St Wolfstan.

Vitellius D: A third OE version was in the Cotton library's Vitellius D. xvii. Unfortunately this volume was destroyed in the fire of 1731.

Vitellius A3: This is one of several Latin translations of the Old English texts. It survived the 1731 fire and is now in the British Library's Cotton Vitellius A 3 ff3-5. Both extant OE texts and this Latin version were published by Felix Liebermann as Die Heiligen Englands: Angelsächsisch unt Lateinisch, a German volume published in 1889, which is still the only scholarly published version of these texts.

== Þá hálgan ==
Þá hálgan (ˈθɑː ˈhɑːlgɑn) is a version of a wider group of texts on the Kentish Royal Legend, and deals with the earliest Christian kings of Kent and their families, and their pious acts, starting with the baptism of king Æthelberht of Kent by Augustine in AD 597. The text traces four generations after Æthelberht, spanning the 7th century and thus the entire period of the Christianization of England. In addition to the extensive genealogy, (in which members of the family marry into the royal families of Mercia, Northumbria and East Anglia) it has an account of the foundation of the Abbey at Minster-in-Thanet, bound up with the lives of two murdered brothers Æthelred and Æthelberht, the founding Abbess at Thanet, Domne Eafe, and her daughter saint Mildthryth.

The particular version of the Legend that accompanies the list of saints below mentions many Kentish saints and their resting places, and thus complements well the Secgan list, which has very few entries from that area. It is possible that a compiler had access to a specifically Kentish list that he drew on while collating his material. In addition to those mentioned above, Þá hálgan notes Æthelburh of Kent (who rests at Lyminge), Eanswith (Folkestone), Eormengyth (near Thanet), Ermenilda (Ely), Seaxburh (Ely), Æthelthryth (Ely), Werburgh (Hanbury, then Chester), Eorcengota (overseas).

== Secgan ==
The Secgan (abbreviated R.P.S. in the Oxford Dictionary of Saints) is a list of 54 places in England where saints' remains are deposited, listing a total of 89 saints, of whom 79 were active in England. The list is itemized with a formulaic Ðonne, e.g.

Ðonne resteð sanctus Congarus confessor on Cungresbirig (37b, "then, St Congar the confessor rests in Congresbury")

in many cases the site is further identified by a topographical feature, mostly a river, e.g.

Ðonne resteð sanctus Iohannes biscop on þare stowe Beferlic, neah þare ea Hul (5a, "then, St John the bishop rests at the site Beverley, near the River Hull"). In addition to the two Old English versions, there are a larger number of manuscripts with the same, or very similar material in Latin. Some of these appear to be direct translations of these known OE lists, while others are from earlier, or divergent lists as the names and places do not have a match in every instance. The list below summarises the names and places from both the Old English lists, and the Latin Secgan of Liebermann's 'V' manuscript.

=== List of the Saints and their resting places ===
"Her onginneð secgan be þam Godes sanctum, þe on Engla lande ærost reston." (Here begins the account of God's saints who first rested in England)
	Saint's name			Resting place				Notes and Refs
1 (Note: Liebermann, 1889, numbers the paragraphs of the Secgan, starting with the title as number 1. Some paragraphs have several locations, denoted #b etc. Several of the locations have more than one saint buried at them. Each different saint has an asterisk bullet point at the start.)	Modern form	Old English	Latin	Town	Church	Old English	Latin	Notes and Refs
2	* Saint Alban	Sanctus Albanus, Martir	Sanctus Albanus, Martyr	St Albans	St Albans Cathedral	Wætlingeceastre	Wætlingeceastre	On the River Ver (Wærlame)
3	* Saint Columba	Columcylle	Sanctusque Columkille	Dunkeld	Dunkeld Cathedral	Duncachán	Duncabeam	On the river Tay (Tau)
4	* Saint Cuthbert	Cuthberhtus	Beatus Cuthbertus	Durham & Northam, Devon	Durham Cathedral	Dunhólm (Stowe has Ubbanford)	Mentions both Dunholm & Ubbanford	On the river Tweed (Twiode)
5	* Oswald of Northumbria	sancte Oswald	sancti Oswaldi regis et martyris	Bamburgh, Durham & Gloucester (Note: Body and sword arm at Bamburgh, Head with St Cuthbert, left arm at Gloucester)		Bebbanbyrig; mid sancte Cuðberhte; Gleaweceastre (Note: OE: þonne resteð Sancte Oswald cyningc on Bebbanbyrig wið þa sǣ, and his heafod resteð mid sancte Cuðberhte, and his swyrða earma is nú on Bebbanbyrig and his lichama resteð nu on niwan mynstre on Gleaweceastre.)	Bebbanberig; beati Cuthberti; Gleaweceastre	Body, head, and arm were dispursed.
5a	* John of Beverley	Iohannes, biscop	Johannes, episcopus	Beverley	Beverley Minster	Beferlic	Beverlic	River Hull (Húl)
6	* Ecgberht of Ripon, * Saint Wilfrid, * Saint Wihtberht	Ecgbriht, Wilferð, Wihtburh (Note: OE: Sancta Ecgbriht, sancte Wilferð, biscop, sancte Wihtburh. Latin: Sanctusque Ecgbertus, sanctus Wilfridus, episcopus, sanctaque Eihtbuerga)	Ecgbertus, Wilfridus, Eihtbuerga	Ripon	Ripon Cathedral	Riopum	Hryopan	River Ure (Earp)
6a	* Chad of Mercia * Cedd * Ceatta	Ceadda, Cedde, Ceatta (Note: OE: Sancte Ceadda, sancte Cedde, sancte Ceatta. Latin: Sanctusque Ceadda, sanctus Cedde, sanctus Ceatta)	Ceadda, Cedde, Ceatta	Lichfield	Lichfield Cathedral	Licetfeld	Licetfeld	River Tame (Tamer)
7	* Saint Hybald of Lindsey	Higebold on Lindesige	Higeboldus apud Lindesige	Hibaldstow	St Hybald's Church, Hibaldstow	Cecesége	Cecesege	River Ancholme (Oncel)
8	* Æthelred I of East Anglia, * Osthryth, * Oswald of Northumbria	Æþered, Ostryð, Oswoldes (Note: Sancte Æþered, se cyningc, Sancte Ostryð, sancte Oswoldes. Latin: sanctus Æðælredus rex)	Æðælredus	Bardney	Bardney Abbey	Bardanege	Bardanig	River Witham (Wiðma)
9	* Saint Eadburh of Southwell/Repton	Eadburh	Ædburh	Southwell	Southwell Minster	Suðwillum	Suðwillan	On the R Trent (Trionte). She was Abbess of Repton and friend of Guthlac
10	* Guthlac of Crowland	Guðlac	Guthlacus	Crowland	Crowland Abbey	Crúland	Cruland	Fens (Girwan Fænne)
11	* Alchmund of Derby	Ealhmund	Ælhmundus	Derby	St Alkmund's Church, Derby (site of)	Norðworþig	Norðwerðig	On the river Derwent (Deorwentan)
12	* Saint Botulph	Botulf	Botulphus	Peterborough (Note: Botolph occurs twice in this list, the other under his well attested location as Botwulf of Thorney. Medeshamstede is a well attested earlier name for Peterborough - which also has entries under its later name of 'Burh'. Thorney is close to, but not the same place as Burh. It is not clear if this entry refers to the same saint using an earlier location name, the same saint divided between two locations, or two different individuals.)		Medeshamstede	Medeshamstede	On the river Nene (Nén)
13	* Æthelberht II of East Anglia	Æþelbriht	Æðbertus	Hereford	Hereford Cathedral	Hereforda	Hereford	On the river Wye (Weæge)
14	* Saint Cetta	Cett	Ceat	Oundle	Oundle Monastery	Undola	Undola	On the river Nene (Nén)
15	* Mildburh	Mildburh	Mildburga	Much Wenlock	Wenlock Priory	Wenlocan	Winlocan	River Severn (Sæfern)
16	* Wigstan (Wistan)	Wigstan	Wigstanus	Repton	Repton Priory	Hreopedune	Reopedune	River Trent (Treonte)
17	* Diuma	Dioma	Dionia	Charlbury	Church of St Mary the virgin	Ceorlingcburh	Ceorlingburh	River Windrush (Wenrisc)
18	* Edith of Polesworth	Eadgið	Eadgyð	Polesworth, Warwickshire	Polesworth Abbey	Polleswyrð	Polleswyrð	River Anker (Oncer)
19	* Rumwold of Buckingham	Rumwold	Rumwoldus	Buckingham	Old Parish Church, Buckingham	Buccingaham	Buckingaham	River Ouse (Usan)
19a	* Æthelberht of Bedford	Æþelbyrht	Æþelbertus	Bedford	unknown	Bydanford	Bedanford	River Ouse (Usan)
20	* Æthelred of Leominster	Æþelred	Æðelredus	Leominster	Leominster Abbey	Leomynstre	Leomenstre	River Lugg (Lucge)
21	* Edmund the Martyr	Ædmund	Ædmundus	Bury St Edmunds	Bury St Edmunds Abbey	Beadriceswyrðe	Beadricesweorðe	in East Anglia (Eastenglum)
22	* Osgyth	Osgið	Osgyð	St Osyth (Chich), Essex	St Osyth's Priory	Cicc	Cice	Near the sea, in St Peter's Monastery
23	* Æthelburh of Barking	Æþelburh	Æðelburga	Barking	Barking Abbey	Beorcyngan	Bercinge	River Thames (Tæmese)
23b	* Earconwald	Erconwald	Erconwaldus	London	Old St Paul's Cathedral	Lundenbirig	civitate Lundonia	
24	* Neot	Neót	Neot	St Neots	St Neots Priory	Eanulfesbirig	Eanulfesberig	('Old friend of Alfred the Great'.)
25	* Ivo of Ramsey * Æthelred and * Æthelberht	IÚa, Æþelred, Æþelbriht	Ivo, sanctique fratres Æðelredus & Æðelbertus	Ramsey, Cambridgeshire	Ramsey Abbey	Ramesige	Ramesige	in the monastery called Barnesige
26	* Florentius of Peterborough * Kyneswide, * Kyneburga	Florentius, Cynesweoð, Cyneburh	Florentius, Kineswiða, Cyneburga	Peterborough	Peterborough Abbey	Burh	Burh	And many others in the Monastery. (Note: OE adds something to the effect that 'Though they are hidden from the people, not all the holy people have works of wonder'(?))
27	* Botwulf of Thorney, * Adulf, * Huna of Thorney, * Tancred, * Torthred, * Herefrith of Thorney, * Cissa of Crowland, * Benedict Biscop, * Tova	Botulf, Aðulf, Huna, þancred, Torhtred, Hereferd, Cissa, Benedictus, Toua	Botulfus, Adulfus, Huna, Pancredus, Torhtredus, Herefridus, Cissa, Benedictus, Tova	Peterborough	Thorney Abbey	þornige	þornege	
28	* Saint Vincentius	Uincentius		Abingdon	Abingdon Abbey	Abbandune		Uincentius martir - Not listed in the Latin V version.
29	* Dunstan & * Augustine of Canterbury	Dunstanus, Agustinus	Augustinus, Dunstanus	Canterbury	St Augustine's Abbey (Note: Monastery of the Apostles Peter and Paul)	Cantwabyrig	Cantuarberig	Also in the city is Christ Church (Cathedral) where other saints are buried.
30	* Paulinus of York	Paulinus	Paulinus	Rochester, Kent	Rochester Cathedral	Rofeceatre	Roueceastre	
31	* Birinus, * Hædde, * Swithun, * (Æthelwold of Winchester), * (Ælfheah the Bald), * (Beornstan of Winchester), * (Frithestan), * Justus of Beauvais.	Birinus, Hæddæ, Swiðun, (Aþelwold),,(Æltheah), (Birnstan), (Friðestan), Iustus	Birinus, Hædda, Swiðunus, Iustus martyr	Winchester	Old Minster, Winchester	Winceastre on Ealdan Mynstre	Aeldermynster apud civitatem Wintonian	(Note: Those in brackets are only listed by the CCCC text. Stowe MS 944 and the Latin V simply allude to 'many others with them'.); Old and New Minsters dedicated to St Swithun.
32	* Judoc, * Grimbald	Iudicus, Grimbadlus	Iudicus, Grimbadlus	Winchester	Winchester Cathedral	Niwan mynstre	Niwemenster	The new minster at Winchester (begun 1079)
33	* Eadburh of Winchester	Eadburh	Ædburh	Winchester	St Mary's Abbey	nunnan minstre	Nunneminster	'in the same city'
34	* Mærwynn, * (Balthild), * (Æthelflæd of Romsey)	Mærwyn, (Balthild), (Æthelflæd)	Merwinna	Romsey	Romsey Abbey	Rumesige	Rumesige	Latin V adds, 'near the River Test'. (Note: CCCC OE includes the two in brackets, and mentions 'and fela oðra helgan' - many other saints.) (Note: From here on, the order of the two OE texts diverges. This list follows the CCCC Old English order, as set out by Heilemann, 1889, re-ordering the matching entries from the other texts accordingly.)
35	* Iwig, * Edith of Wilton	Iwi, Eadgið	Iwig, Eadgiða	Wilton	Wilton Abbey	Wiltune	Wiltune	
36	* Edward the Martyr, * Ælfgifu of Shaftesbury	Eadweard cyningc, Ælfgiuu	Ædwardus rex, Ælfgyfa	Shaftesbury	Shaftesbury Abbey	Sceaftesbirig	Sceaftesbyrig	
37	* Aidan of Lindisfarne, * Saint Patrick	Aidanus, Patricius	Aidanus, Patricius	Glastonbury	Glastonbury Abbey	Glæstingabirig	Glæstingabyrig	
37b	* Congar of Congresbury	Congarus	Congarus	Congresbury, Somerset		Cungresbirig	Cungresbyrig	'Congarus confessor'
38	* Sativola (Sidwell)	Sidefulla	Sydefulla	Exeter	St Sidwell's Chapel(?)	Exanceastre	Exanceastre	
39	* Rumon of Tavistock	Rumonus	Romanus	Tavistock	Tavistock Abbey	Tæuistoce	Tæfistoce	
40	* Saint Petroc	Petrocus	Petrocus	Padstow (Pedrocstowe)	Lanwethinoc Monastery	Westwealum	Westwealum	At an Arm of the sea called Eglemouth (Hægelmuða)
41	* Máel Dub, * Aldhelm, * Johannes Scotus Eriugena (Note: William of Malmsbury claimed that this referred to Iohannes Erigena; but this is now thought to have been an error by William, and that another saint named John the Wise was being referred to.)	Mæildul, Aldhelmus, Iohann se wisa	Aldelmus, Iohannus sapiens	Malmesbury	Malmesbury Abbey	Ealdelmesbirig	Aldelmesberig	
42	* Oswald of Worcester	Oswaldus		Worcester	Worcester Priory	Wigeraceastre		And many other holy bishops with him. [nb Only the CCCC OE includes this entry. Stowe and Latin V omit it]
43	* Egwin of Evesham	Egwinus, bisceop on Eoveshamme	Ecgwinus	Evesham	Evesham Abbey	Eoveshamme	Efesham	On the River Afon (Aféne)
44	* Saint Kenelm	Kenelm	Kynelmus	Winchcombe	Winchcombe Abbey	Winclescumbe	Winclescumbe	
45	* Cuthburh	Cuðburh	Cuðburh	Wimborne	Wimborne Minster	Winburnem Mynstre	Winburnem Menster	
46	* Frithuswith	Fryðesweoð	Fryðeswiða	Oxford	Priory of St Frideswide	Oxenaforda	Oxnaforda	
47	* Branwalator	Brangwalatoris	Branwalator	Milton Abbas	Milton Abbey	Middeltune	Mideltune	CCCC says his head only. Also an arm of 'Samsones'.
48	* Cuthmann of Steyning	Cuðmann	Cuthmannus	Steyning, Sussex	Church of St Andrew and St Cuthman	Stæningum	Stæninge	Near the river Bramber (Bræmbre/Bremre)
49	* Beocca, * Edor	Beocca, Edor	Beocca, Edor	Chertsey	Chertsey Abbey	Cyrtesige	Ceortesige	And 90 men slain by pagans
50	Si lof and wuldor haelendum Criste his godnessa in eara worulda world on écnysse, amen! (Praise and honour to the Saviour Christ, his goodness in all the world is forever, amen.) (Note: Translation needs checking)							Final benediction only in CCCC, not in Stowe or Latin V.
51	* Melor	Melorius	Melorius	Amesbury	Amesbury Abbey	Ambresbyrig	Ambresbyrig	(In Stowe and Latin V only - This is the only place not present in CCCC)

== See also ==
- Anglo-Saxon Christianity
- Anglo-Saxon saints
- List of Anglo-Saxon saints

== Bibliography ==
- Farmer, David Hugh (1992). The Oxford Dictionary of Saints. Oxford University Press.
- Dissertatio Epistolaris in Hickes, George; Fountaine, Andrew; Runólfur Jónsson; Wanley, Humphrey (1705). Linguarum vett. septentrionalium thesaurus grammatico-criticus et archæologicus. Oxoniæ: e Theatro Sheldoniano. p. 115.
- Liebermann, F. (1889). Die Heiligen Englands: angelsächsisch und lateinisch. Hannover: Hahn. (Contains the full text of both Þá hálgan and Secgan in Old English and Latin.)
- Ridyard, Susan J. (1989-01-26). The royal saints of Anglo-Saxon England: A study of West Saxon and East Anglian cults. Cambridge University Press. doi:10.1017/cbo9780511560187. ISBN 978-0-521-30772-7.
- Rollason, D. W. (1978). "Lists of saints' resting-places in Anglo-Saxon England". Anglo-Saxon England. 7: 61–93. doi:10.1017/S0263675100002866. ISSN 0263-6751.
- Rollason, D. W. (1982), The Mildrith Legend: A Study in Early Medieval Hagiography in England, Leicester: Leicester University Press, ISBN 0-7185-1201-4
