= Eye, Cambridgeshire =

Village in Cambridgeshire, England

Coordinates: 52.602°N 0.200°W

Eye
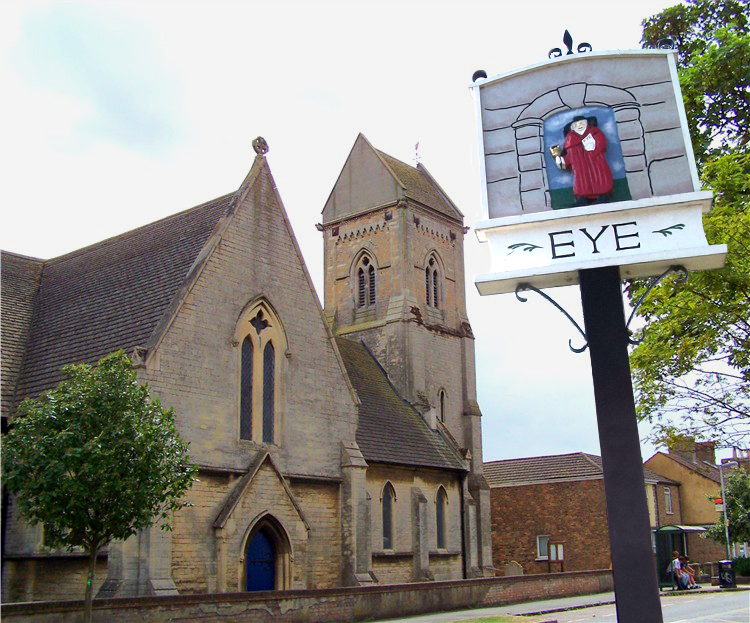
- Eye parish church of St.Matthew's

- Location within Cambridgeshire
- OS grid reference: TF2202
- Unitary authority: Peterborough
- Ceremonial county: Cambridgeshire
- Region: East
- Country: England
- Sovereign state: United Kingdom
- Post town: Peterborough
- Postcode district: PE6
- UK Parliament: Peterborough

Eye is a village in the unitary authority area of Peterborough, in the ceremonial county of Cambridgeshire, England. The village is 3.8 miles (6 km) west of Thorney and 4.5 miles (7 km) south of Crowland, both known for their historic abbeys. The hamlet of Eye Green is immediately to the north, separated by the A47 trunk road.

== History ==
According to A Dictionary of British Place Names, Eye derives from the Old English ēg, meaning a place at "the island or well-watered land, or dry ground in marsh". In the 10th century, this particular Eye was spelt "Ege".

There has been a chapel at Eye since at least 1543. The present church, dedicated to Matthew the Apostle, was built by George Basevi in 1846. The 125 feet (40 m) broach spire added 10 years later was removed for safety reasons in the early 1980s and the steeple now has a saddleback roof. Adjoining the southeast corner of the churchyard on Back Lane stands the former village fire station dating from 1826, when it housed a Merryweather fire engine. Closed after 1945, it was repaired by the parish council in 2011.

Eye Cornmill was an eight-storey windmill with eight sails 75 yards (70 m) from the church. The village previously had a brick pit (a quarry for clay for making bricks). Northolme in Crowland Road was the site of the brickworks social club. When this closed, the buildings and pit were taken over by the British Sub-Aqua Club and run as a national dive site. The buildings were later demolished and it is now a nature reserve.

=== Transport ===
Eye Green railway station (originally named Eye) on the Midland and Great Northern Joint Railway line between Peterborough and Wisbech was opened in 1866 and closed in 1957. Eye war memorial, carved in granite, was erected at Crowland Road cemetery in 1920. It is dedicated to forty-one killed in the First World War, with fourteen Second World War deaths added later. The memorial was Grade II-listed in 2016.

The £7.5 million A47 bypass was opened in October 1991, by Malcolm Moss MP.

=== 1983 mid-air collision ===
There was a mid-air collision between two Harriers at 11.40 am on 23 February 1983, at around 10,000 ft (3,000 m).

From the two-seat Harrier XW926 two aircrew were killed:

- Flt Lt John Leeming, 39, married with two children, attended St Mary's College
- Flying Officer David Haigh, aged 21, from Sidmouth in east Devon

The pilot of Harrier XV795 of 3 Sqn, Flt Lt D Oakley, aged 32, ejected and landed in Borough Fen, Crowland, around 500 m (1,600 ft) from the Lincolnshire boundary.

== Geography ==
Eye was part of the Soke of Peterborough in Northamptonshire until 1965, when it became part of the short-lived county of Huntingdon and Peterborough. Since 1974, it has formed part of the City of Peterborough in Cambridgeshire. The Eye, Thorney and Newborough ward, comprising 133.1 square kilometres (51.4 mi^{2}), was formed in 2016; it elects three councillors.

The three-mile £7 million A47 Eye bypass opened in October 1991. In recent decades Eye has expanded due to a growing demand for property. However this expansion has been strongly resisted by residents. Between 2001 and 2011, the population grew from under 3,900 to over 4,400.

== Community facilities ==
Local facilities include a GP surgery, a dentist's surgery, a library, a community centre, a care home, a household recycling centre, a cemetery and a skate park. There are shops and restaurants in the village. There is a Church of England primary school on Eyebury Road.
