= Ceatta =

Anglo Saxon saint of the Catholic Church

Saint Ceatta of Lichfield
- Venerated in: Catholic Church
- Canonized: Pre-Congregation
- Major shrine: Lichfield (destroyed)

Ceatta of Lichfield is an obscure Anglo Saxon saint of the Catholic Church.

He is unknown beyond a mention in the 11th-century Old English listing On the Resting-Places of the Saints. (Secgan be þam Godes sanctum þe on Engla lande ærost reston), which states that St. Chad ("Ceadda"), St. Cedd ("Cedde") and St Ceatta are buried in the monastery at Lichfield.

In the Prosopography of Anglo-Saxon England Ceatta shares a listing with Headda of Hereford, alternatively called Ceadda, an 8th-century bishop of Hereford; but this association is not certain. St. Chad floruit in the 7th century around Lichfield in what was the Kingdom of Mercia, and St Cedd was his brother.

Ceatta, is an old English personal name meaning a swamp although a Welsh origin has also been postulated. Alternatively the name may be derived from his association with Chad or his well. It is also possible that he is merely a duplication of St Ceadda.
