= Eye Green =

Hamlet in Cambridgeshire, England

Coordinates: 52.617°N 0.186°W

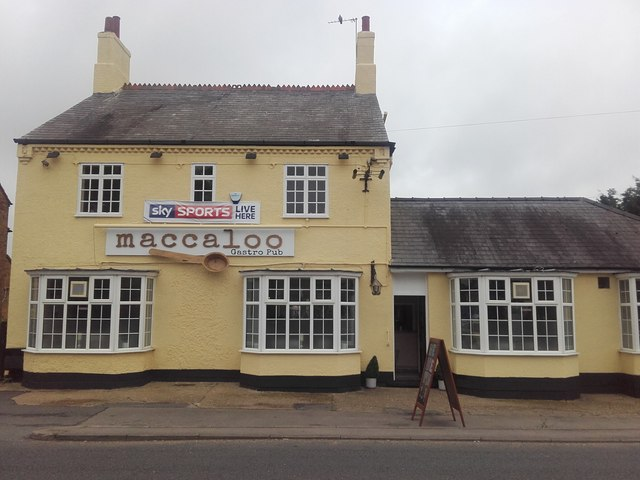
- Maccaloo

- Location within Cambridgeshire
- OS grid reference: TF2203
- Civil parish: Eye
- Unitary authority: Peterborough
- Ceremonial county: Cambridgeshire
- Region: East
- Country: England
- Sovereign state: United Kingdom
- Post town: PETERBOROUGH
- Postcode district: PE6
- Dialling code: 01733

Eye Green is a hamlet in the civil parish of Eye, in the unitary authority area of Peterborough, in the ceremonial county of Cambridgeshire, England. It lies north of Eye and south of Crowland.

Eye Green Nature Reserve abounds the A47 Trunk Road, which separates Eye Green from its sister village of Eye. North of the nature reserve is a geological Site of Special Scientific Interest, Eye Gravel Pit.

== See also ==
- Eye Green railway station
