= Huna of Thorney =

7th-century English saint

Saint Huna of Thorney

Saint
- Died: 7th Century; Huneia
- Venerated in: Catholic Church
- Major shrine: Thorney
- Feast: 13 February

Saint Huna of Thorney was a seventh century priest and hermit. His influence in the Northumbrian and Anglian courts make him an important figure in the Christianisation of Anglo-Saxon England.

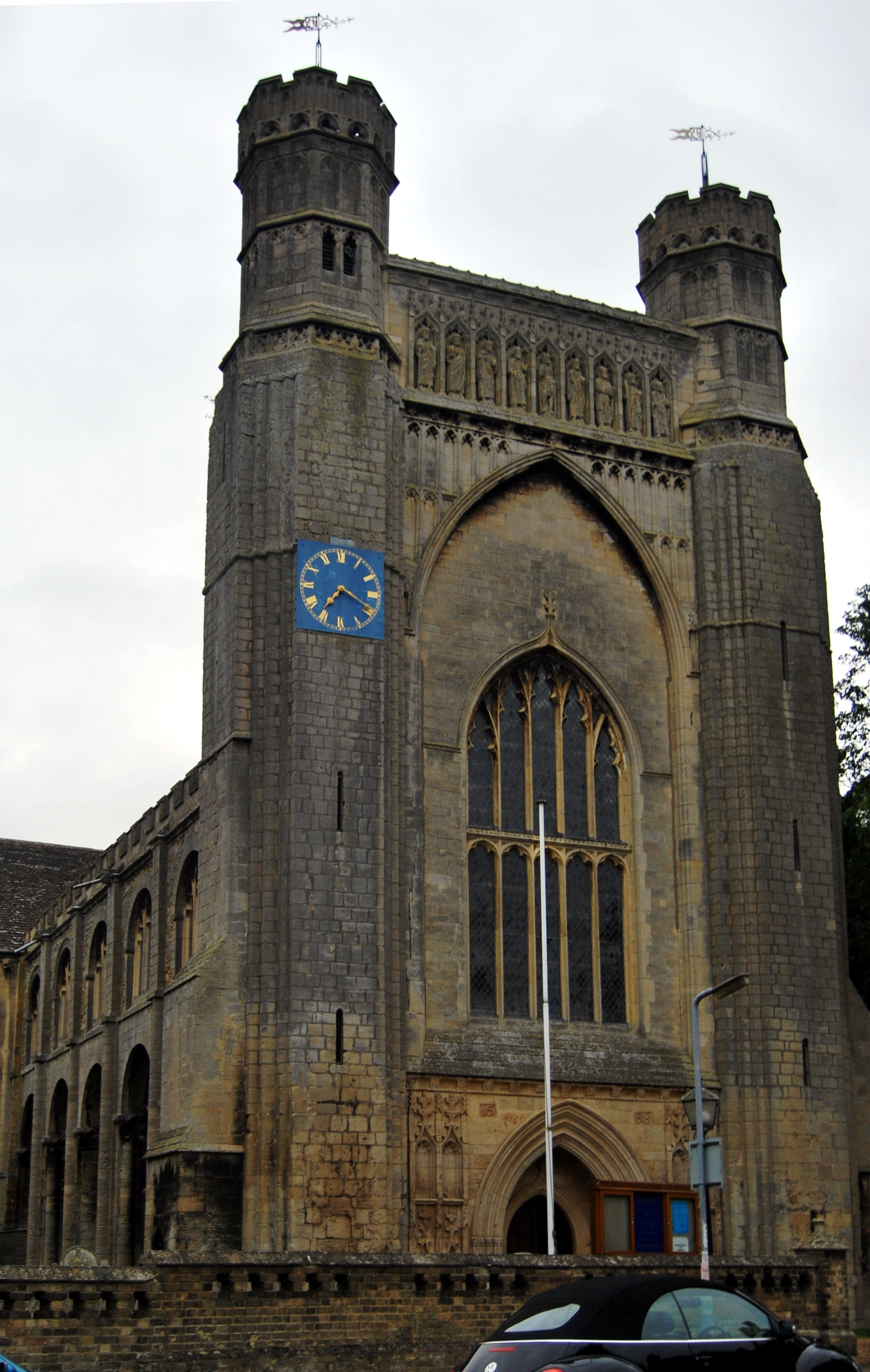
Thorney Abbey Church

Huna was a chaplain for Æthelthryth the daughter of Anna of East Anglia, Queen of Ecgfrith, king of the Northumbrians and the Abbess of Ely and he gave Æthelthryth advice pertaining to salvation and talked to her about the teachings and deeds of the saints. St Huna also conducted her funeral.

After her death, Huna left Ely to become a hermit on an island in the Cambridgeshire Fens. His residence on the island was called Huneia and later known as Honey Hill, or Honey Farm, which is located just outside the town of Chatteris. Huna was considered a holy man and his grave on the small island was known for producing healing miracles. Later Huna's relics were translated from Chatteris to Thorney, at the time more a collection of hermit cells than a monastic institution.

Huna's feast day is 13 February.
