= Adulf =

7th-century Anglo-Saxon saint

Saint Adulf
- Born: unknown
- Died: c. 680
- Venerated in: Roman Catholic Church; Eastern Orthodox Church
- Feast: 17 June

Saint Adulf (also Adolph, Adolf, Athwulf, Æthelwulf or Æðelwulf) (died c. 680 AD) was an Anglo-Saxon saint.

== Life ==
Adulf is said to have been the brother of Botolph, but virtually nothing is known about his life. Church historian Frederick George Holweck says he was not Botolph's brother.

The story, which originated with a monk of Thorney, Folcard's account of Botolph's life, that Adulf was at one-time bishop of Maastricht, is now generally thought to rest on a confusion of names and to have no substance. However, it does explain the reason today's saint is often honoured as a bishop.

The monastery at Iken, in the Kingdom of East Anglia, was destroyed in Viking raids. It is said that when by the orders of Æthelwold of Winchester, Botolph's body was disinterred for translation to the new abbey of Thorney, Adulf's body was buried with it, and as it proved impossible to disentangle the bones, the remains of both saints were taken to Thorney, where the relics of Adulf remained. The feast day of both saints is 17 June.
