= Glan-yr-afon, Gwynedd =

Coordinates: 52.970°N 3.453°W

Glan-yr-afon
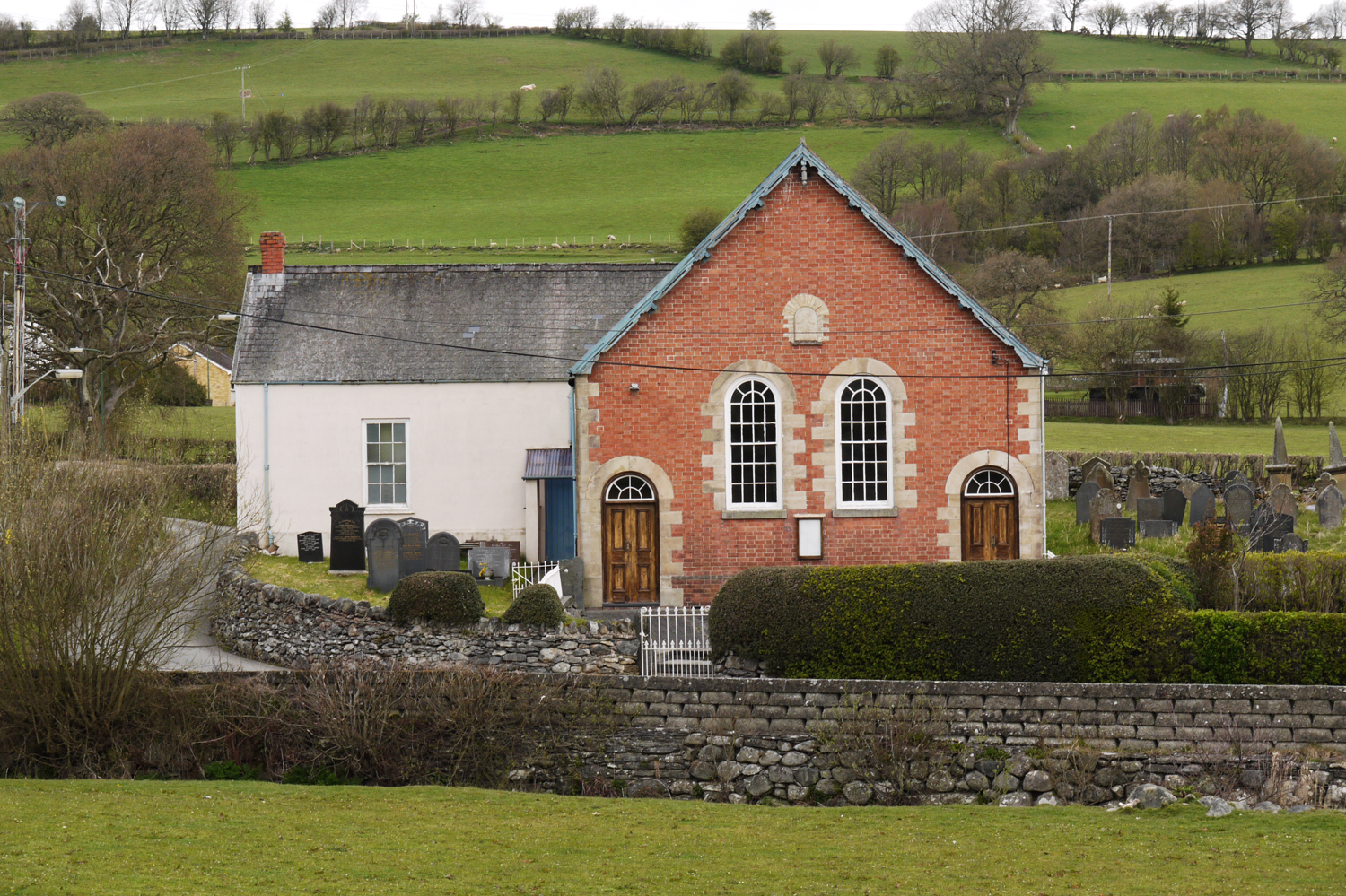
- Llawrybettws Methodist Chapel at Glan-yr-afon

- Location within Gwynedd
- OS grid reference: SJ024424
- Community: Llandderfel
- Principal area: Gwynedd
- Country: Wales
- Sovereign state: United Kingdom
- Post town: CORWEN
- Postcode district: LL21
- Dialling code: 01490
- Police: North Wales
- Fire: North Wales
- Ambulance: Welsh
- UK Parliament: Dwyfor Meirionnydd
- Senedd Cymru – Welsh Parliament: Dwyfor Meirionnydd

Glan-yr-afon is a small village near Corwen in Gwynedd, Wales, situated on the A494. The village lies on the boundary between Gwynedd and Denbighshire. Glanyrafon is approximately 103 miles from Cardiff, and the nearest town is Bala (7 miles).

Glanyrafon is represented in the Cymru Senedd by Mabon ap Gwynfor (Plaid Cymru) and the Member of Parliament is Liz Saville Roberts (Plaid Cymru).

Local businesses in Glan-yr-afon include a garage, a cafè, the Llawrbetws Caravan Park and a glassblowers, the Glassblobbery Studio and Gallery. The village also has a church and a chapel. Nearby is the Braich Ddu wind farm, operated by REG.

Notable people include:

- D. Tecwyn Lloyd (1914-1992), Welsh literary critic, author and educationalist

- Dr Iwan Bryn Williams (1936-2017), mathematician and poet

- Rhys Gwynfor (1990-present), Welsh language musician and TV personality
