= Eye Gravel Pit =

Protected area in Cambridgeshire, England

Coordinates: 52.616°N 0.185°W

- Site of Special Scientific Interest
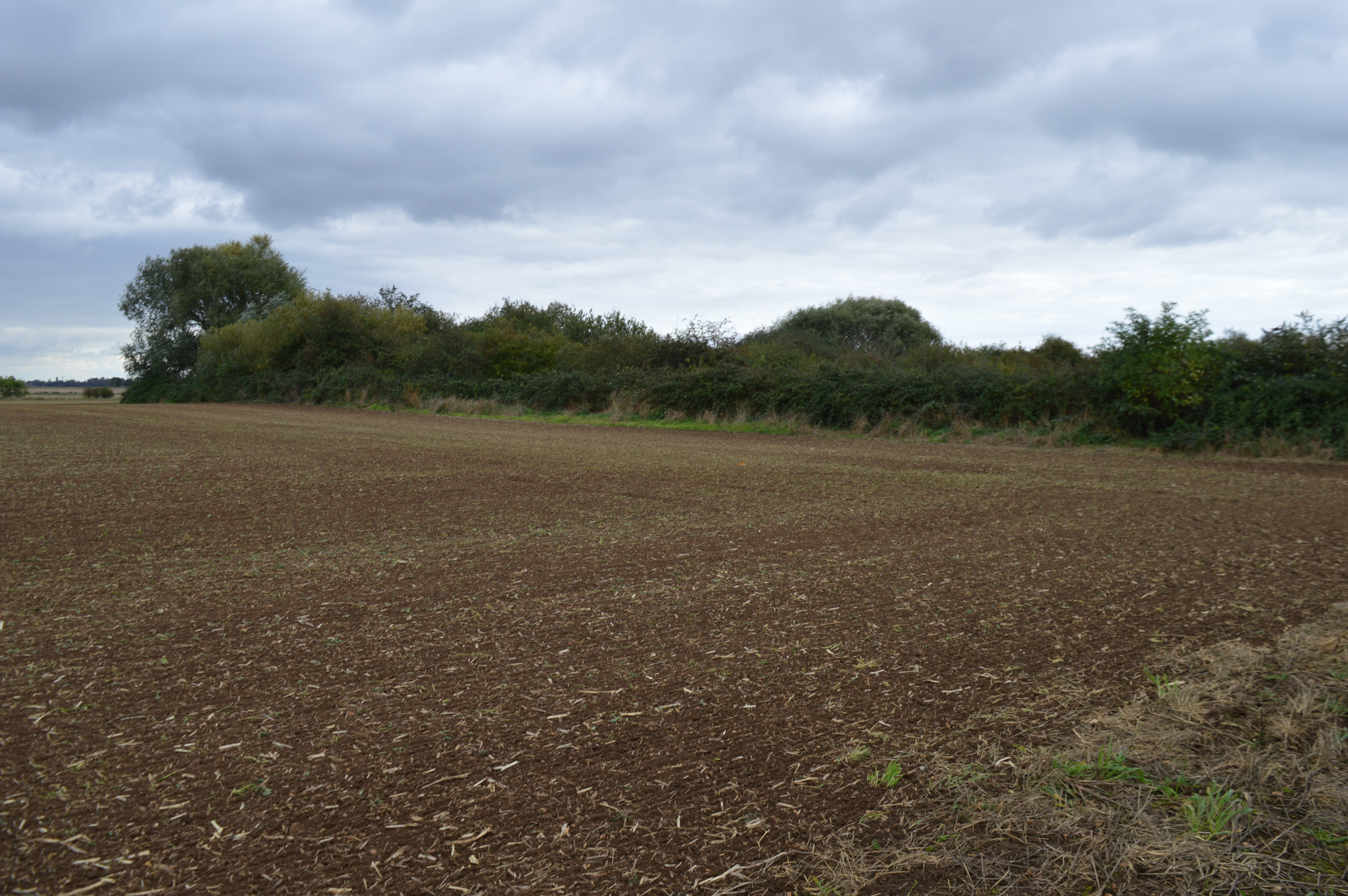
- Location of Eye Gravel Pit.
- Area of search: Cambridgeshire
- Grid reference: TF 230 036
- Interest: Geological
- Area: 0.4 hectares
- Notification date: 1986
- Location map: Magic Map

Eye Gravel Pit is a 0.4-hectare (0.99-acre) geological Site of Special Scientific Interest in Eye Green in Cambridgeshire. It is a Geological Conservation Review site, and part of it overlaps Eye Green Local Nature Reserve.

This former gravel quarry in the East Anglian Fens has marine and a few non-marine shells laid down when the area was under the North Sea, probably during the warm Eemian period, 130,000 to 115,000 years ago. It is described by Natural England as important because it lies at the junction between fluvial and glacial deposits.

The site is private land with no public access.
