= Shadwell (disambiguation) =

Shadwell is an area of London, England.

Shadwell may also refer to:

- Shadwell (name), including a list of people with the name
- Shadwell railway station, a station on the London Overground
- Shadwell DLR station, a station on the Docklands Light Railway
- Shadwell, Gloucestershire, a hamlet of Uley, England
- Shadwell, Norfolk, a location in England
- Shadwell, Leeds, a village in north east Leeds, West Yorkshire, England
- Shadwell, Virginia, a plantation in Virginia, USA
- USS Shadwell (LSD-15), United States Ship

== See also ==
- Siadwel the Welsh poet (pronounced "Shadwell"), a character from the 1980s BBC sketch show Naked Video
- Chadwell (disambiguation)
