= Thorney railway station =

Former railway station in Cambridgeshire, England

Coordinates: 52.6241°N 0.1087°W

Thorney
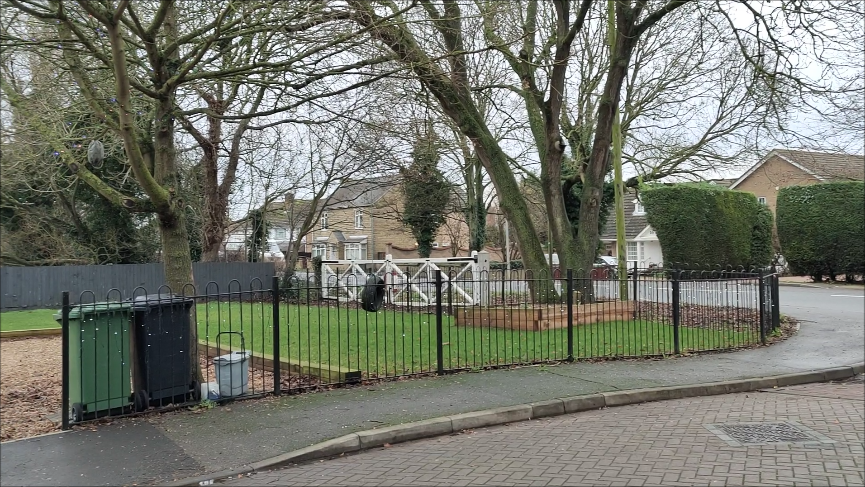
- Site of Thorney station

General information
- Location: Thorney, City of Peterborough; England
- Platforms: 2

Other information
- Status: Disused

History
- Original company: Peterborough, Wisbeach and Sutton Railway
- Pre-grouping: Midland and Great Northern Joint Railway
- Post-grouping: Midland and Great Northern Joint Railway

Key dates
- 1 August 1866: Opened
- 2 December 1957: Closed for passengers
- 28 December 1964: closed for freight
Location

Thorney railway station was a station in Thorney, Cambridgeshire on the Midland and Great Northern Joint Railway line between Peterborough and Wisbech.

Preceding station	Disused railways	Following station
Eye Green	Midland and Great Northern; Peterborough Line	Wryde
