= REG WindPower =

Renewable energy company in the UK

REG WindPower is a renewable energy company in the United Kingdom.

REG Windpower is one of the UK’s leading developers and operators of small to medium-sized wind farms, operating nine sites in England and one in Wales, with a combined operational capacity of 41.15 MW.

The ultimate parent company Renewable Energy Generation Limited, registered in Jersey, was put into liquidation in January 2016.

== Wind farms owned and operated by REG ==
Its nine operational wind farms are:

- Braich Ddu, Glan-yr-afon, Gwynedd;
- Goonhilly Downs, the Lizard, Cornwall;
- High Haswell, Easington, County Durham;
- High Pow, Wigton, Cumbria;
- High Sharpley, County Durham;
- Loscar, Harthill, Rotherham;
- Ramsey, Cambridgeshire;
- Roskrow Barton, Penryn, Cornwall;
- St Breock, Cornwall;
- Whittlesey, Peterborough.

== Company history ==
REG Windpower was founded as the Cornwall Light and Power Company in 1989, and changed its name to REG Windpower in 2010. REG Windpower is owned by Renewable Energy Generation Ltd.

REG Ltd is listed on the London Stock Exchange Alternative Investment Market (AIM).

As well developing, building and operating wind farms, the group also generates renewable energy from used cooking oil through its subsidiary company REG Bio-Power.

== Financial Results ==
In March 2011, REG reported pre-tax losses, which the company blamed on unusually low wind levels in the preceding year.

Financial Year 2012 - pre-tax loss of £2,313,731

Financial Year 2013 - pre-tax loss of £4,683,136

Financial Year 2014 - pre-tax loss of £4,838,896

Financial Year 2015 - pre-tax loss of £17,678,599

== Proposed new wind farms ==
In October 2011, REG Windpower launched public consultation on several new wind farms in England. If completed, these projects will have a combined installed capacity of almost 50 MW.

The projects are:

- Bank House Farm, Croft, North East Lincolnshire;
- French Farm Extension, Thorney, Peterborough;
- Grange Farm, Wiltshire;
- M48, South Gloucestershire;
- Mendennick, Cornwall;
- St Breock Repower, Cornwall;
- Steadfold Lane, Ketton, Rutland.
- Old River Don, Crowle, Lincolnshire
- Knockshinnoch, Rankinston, East Ayrshire
- Langthwaite, Millom, Cumbria

== Controversies ==
REG Windpower has attracted criticism over their selection of some of their development sites.

- Old River Don wind farm - the site chosen for 6 turbines was the site of two World War II graves. A Lancaster bomber crashed in September 1945 and two Australian airmen were never found. The location of one of the turbines was to be close to where the crash site was believed to be.
- Knockshinnoch Wind Farm - East Ayrshire Council Planning Committee granted consent for the site on 30 January 2015 despite an objection from West of Scotland Archaeology Service due to the existence of Carline Knowe, a prehistoric cairn sitting just a few metres from the base of the turbines. The site is located 200 metres from the edge of Dunstonhill surface mine which was abandoned following the collapse of Scottish Coal in April 2013. Many local residents were unhappy with further development in this area while Dunstonhill blighted the landscape. The site also sits just 488 metres from the nearest home despite Scottish Government Guidance recommending a minimum separation distance for this size of turbine (126.5 metres height) being 900 metres. In total 26 separate planning policies and guidance were breached however the Planning Committee overturned the advice of the Planning Department to refuse.

== See also ==
- Green electricity in the United Kingdom
- Wind power in the United Kingdom
- Energy policy of the United Kingdom
- Energy use and conservation in the United Kingdom
