= Tancred, Torthred, and Tova =

Saints Tancred, Torthred, & Tova

Hermits, Martyrs
- Died: circa 869 or 870; England
- Venerated in: Catholic Church; Anglican Communion; Western Orthodoxy
- Canonized: Pre-Congregation
- Major shrine: Thorney Abbey (destroyed)
- Feast: 30 September; 9 or 10 April

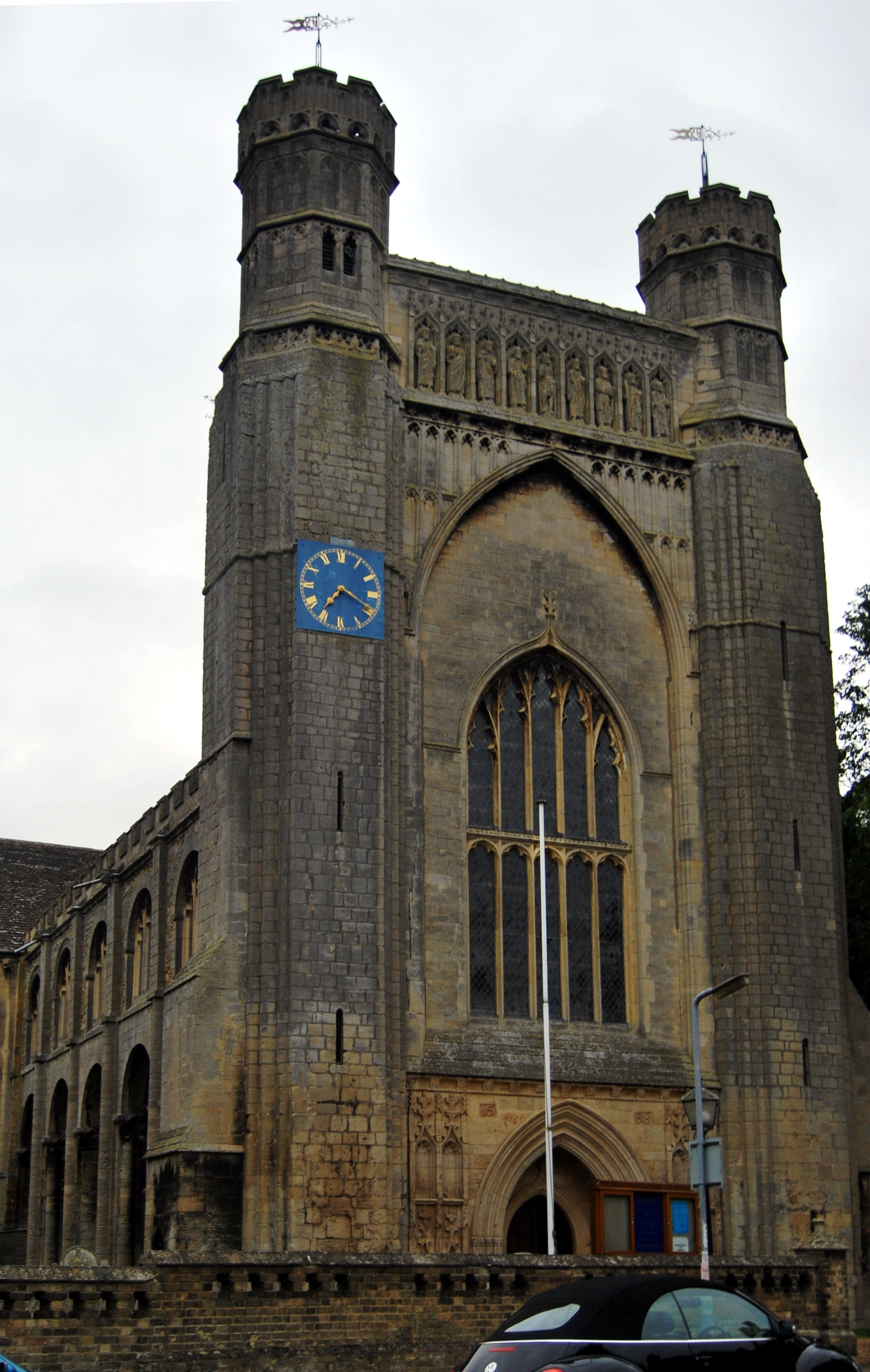
Thorney Abbey Church.

Saints Tancred, Torthred, and Tova were three Anglo-Saxon siblings who were saints, hermits and martyrs of the ninth century. Their feast day was celebrated on 30 September at Thorney and Deeping.

== Lives ==
The brothers Tancred and Torthred, with their sister Tova, lived at Thorney, Cambridgeshire, at the time little more than a collection of hermit cells in the Fens, rather than a monastic institution. They, like many hermits at Thorney, were killed by the Danes in 870. Nothing other than their martyrdom is known of them.

== Provenance ==
The story of their martyrdom rests on the chronicle of Pseudo-Ingulf, an often unreliable document which includes sources older than the 12th century. They were, however, venerated in Thorney Abbey by the year 1000, as witnessed by R.P.S., C.S.P. and William of Malmesbury, and were among the many saints whose bodies were translated by Ethelwold. The first record of their existence dates from 973, when they were installed in the abbey at Thorney.

== Torthred of Thorney ==
Saint Torthred of Thorney was a saint and hermit of the ninth century in Anglo-Saxon England. According to Pseudo-Ingulf he was martyred with many of his brother monks by pagan Danish raiders in 869. His feast day is sometimes celebrated on 9 April or 10 April, and there is some conjecture that Torthred (and possibly Tova) did not die in the 869 raids but instead lived his last years at Cerne in Dorset, in a similar way to Eadwold of Cerne.
