= Eye Green Local Nature Reserve =

Park in United Kingdom

Coordinates: 52.615°N 0.183°W

Eye Green
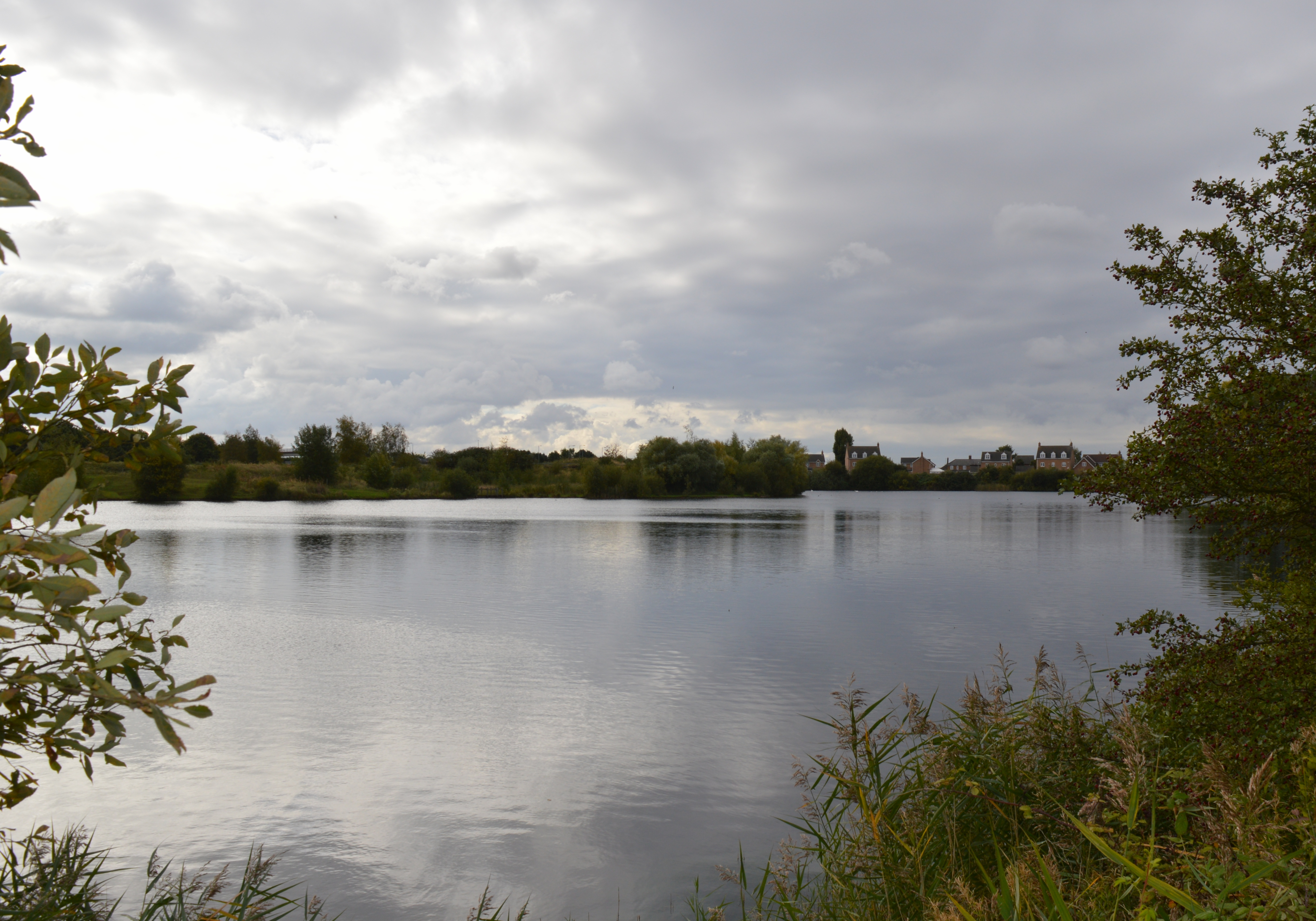
- Interactive map of Eye Green
- Type: Local Nature Reserve
- Location: Eye Green, Cambridgeshire
- OS grid: TF 230 034
- Area: 12 hectares (30 acres)
- Manager: Peterborough City Council

Eye Green Local Nature Reserve is a 12 hectare Local Nature Reserve in Eye Green in Cambridgeshire. It was managed by the Wildlife Trust for Bedfordshire, Cambridgeshire and Northamptonshire until September 2016, when management was transferred to its owner, Peterborough City Council. A small (and inaccessible) part is also in the Eye Gravel Pit geological Site of Special Scientific Interest.

This site was formerly brick workings, and a large area is now filled by a lake. Reeds and scrub line much of the shore, providing cover for water birds such coots and moorhens, while dunnocks and great tits nest in dense scrub. There is grassland with many flowers, and diverse invertebrate species.

There is access from Pershore Way.

== See also ==
- Dogsthorpe Star Pit
