= Eye Green railway station =

Former railway station in Cambridgeshire, England

Eye Green
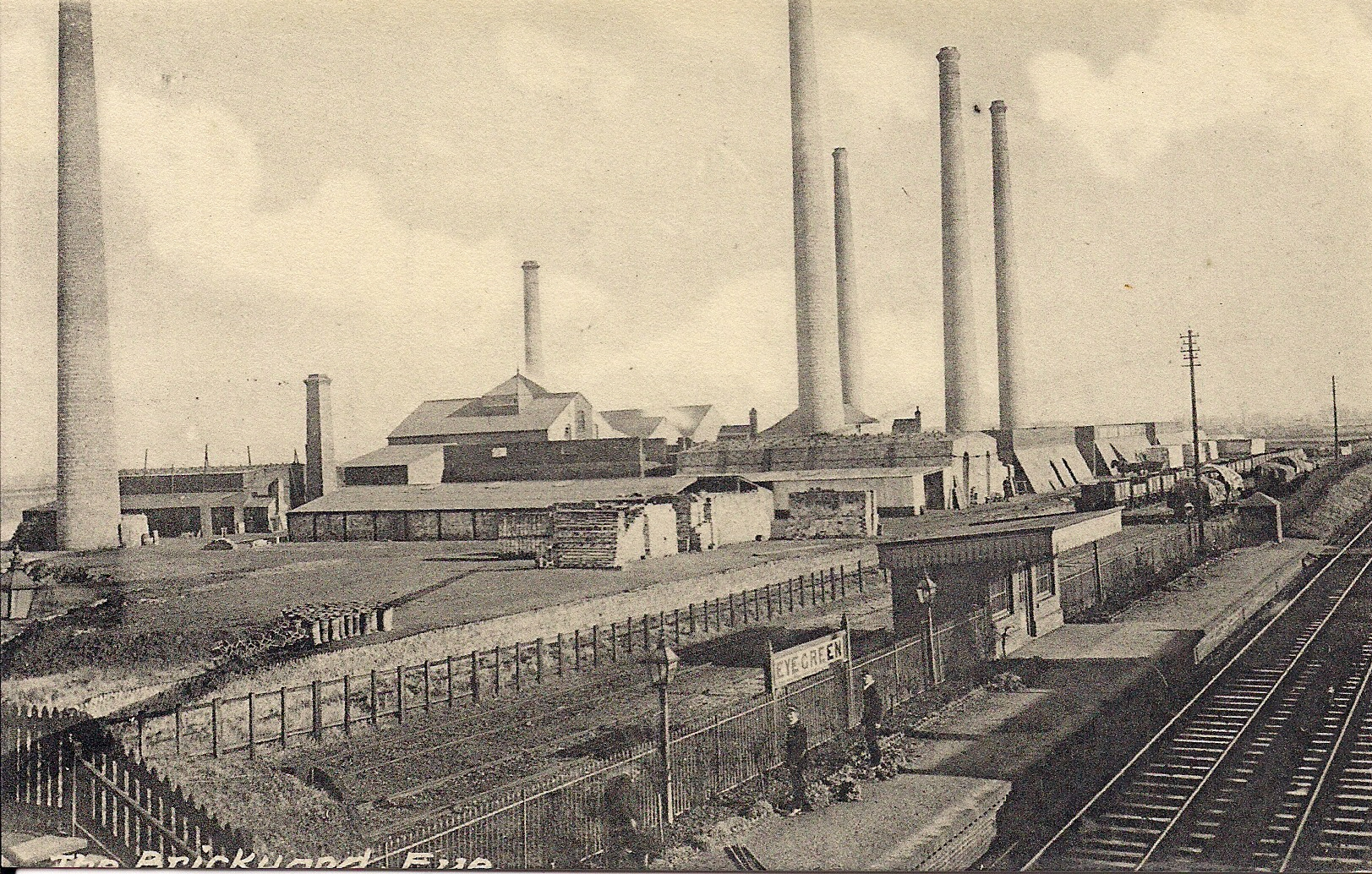

General information
- Location: Eye, City of Peterborough; England
- Coordinates: 52.6122°N 0.1852°W
- Grid reference: TF230031
- Platforms: 2

Other information
- Status: Disused

History
- Original company: Peterborough, Wisbeach and Sutton Railway
- Pre-grouping: Midland and Great Northern Joint Railway
- Post-grouping: Midland and Great Northern Joint Railway

Key dates
- 1 August 1866: Station opened as Eye
- 1 October 1875: Renamed Eye Green
- 2 December 1957: Station closed
Location

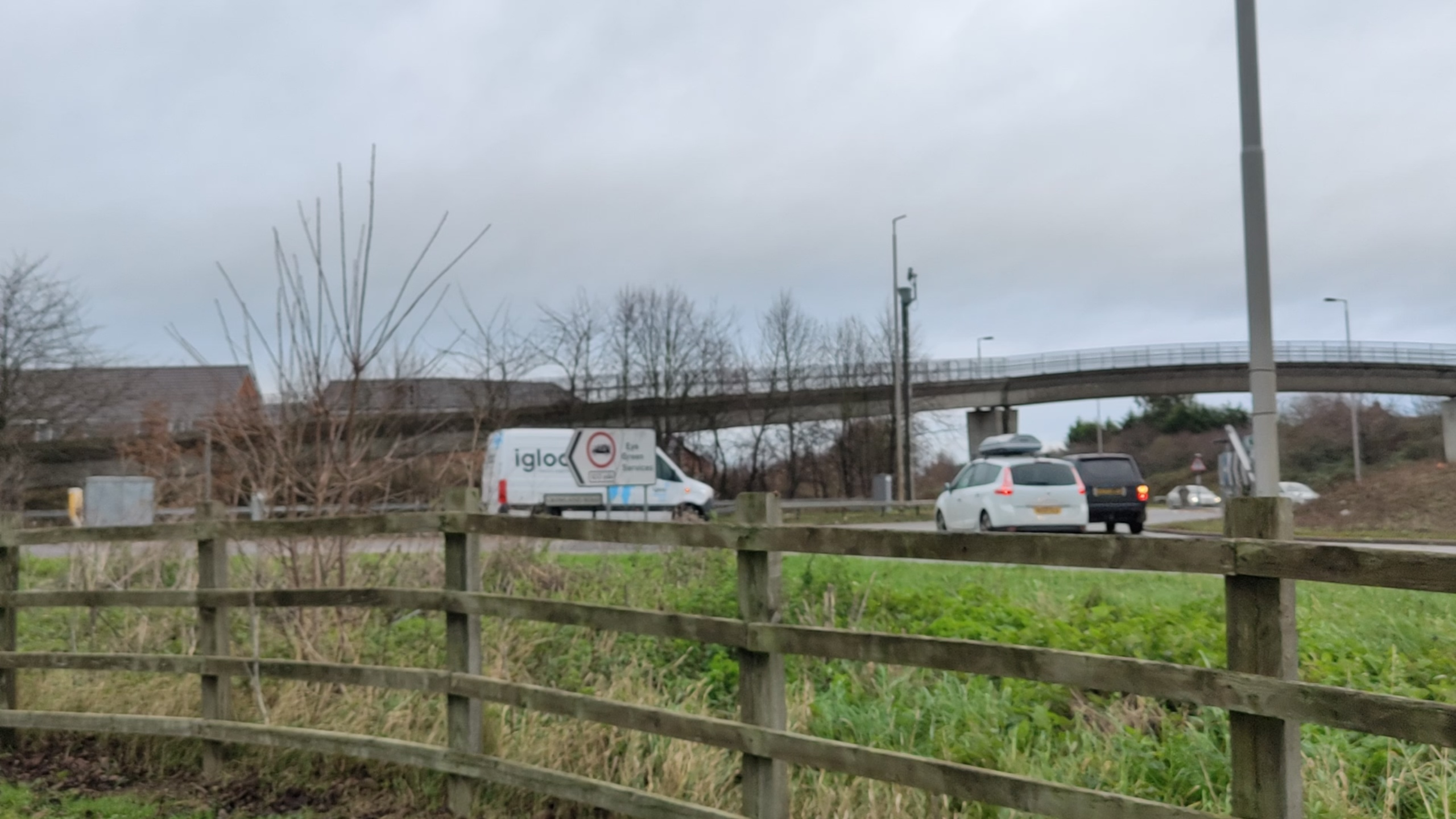
The site of Eye Green station in 2022. Now occupied by a bypass, housing and services.

Eye Green railway station was a station in Eye, Cambridgeshire, on the Midland and Great Northern Joint Railway line between Peterborough and Wisbech.

== History ==
The station was opened by the Peterborough, Wisbeach and Sutton Railway (PW&SR) on 1 August 1866 and was originally named "Eye"; it was renamed "Eye Green" on 1 October 1875.

The PW&SR became part of the Midland and Great Northern Joint Railway. It later came under the control of British Railways and was closed on 2 December 1957. The station's name as given in some timetables "Eye Green for Crowland" was misleading, since a passenger would have a three-mile walk to Crowland.

The station was adjacent to the Northam works of the London Brick Company. There was a busy siding where bricks were hand loaded onto trucks - before the days of palletisation.

There were through trains to Hunstanton, via King's Lynn.

Preceding station	Disused railways	Following station
Peterborough North; Line closed, station open	Midland and Great Northern; Peterborough Line	Thorney; Line and station closed
