= Cissa of Crowland =

Mercian saint

Saint Cissa of Crowland

Abbot of Crowland
- Venerated in: Roman Catholic Church
- Major shrine: Thorney Abbey
- Feast: 23 September

Cissa of Crowland was a saint in the medieval Fenlands. He was the successor of Guthlac as abbot of Crowland, and is mentioned in Felix' Vita Guthlaci. According to the Crowland Chronicle his tomb was next to Guthlac's, and like the tomb of Guthlac, was destroyed by the Scandinavians. His relics were translated to Thorney Abbey in the 10th-century.
