= Wryde railway station =

Former railway station in Cambridgeshire, England

Coordinates: 52°37′34″N 00°03′26″W

Wryde
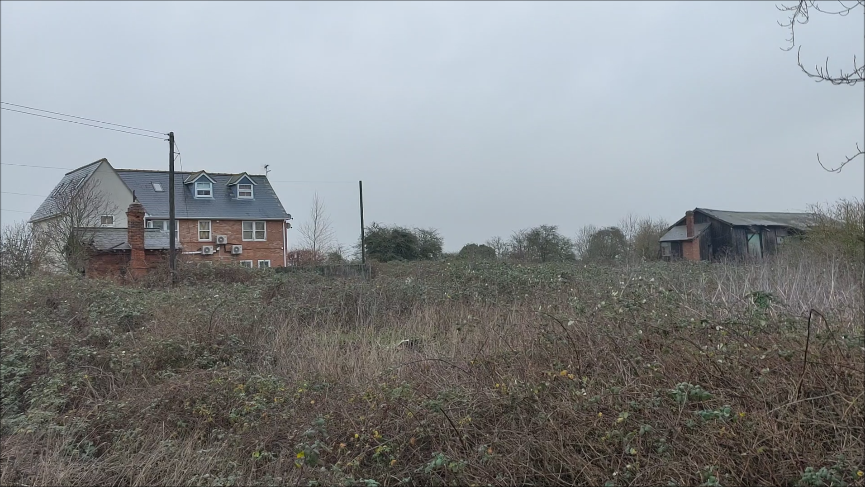
- Wryde station in 2022, now a private residence

General information
- Location: Wryde, City of Peterborough; England
- Platforms: 2

Other information
- Status: Disused

History
- Original company: Peterborough, Wisbeach and Sutton Railway
- Pre-grouping: Midland and Great Northern Joint Railway
- Post-grouping: Midland and Great Northern Joint Railway

Key dates
- 1 Aug 1866: Opened
- 2 Dec 1957: Closed for passengers
- 13 July 1964: closed for freight
Location

Wryde railway station was a station serving Wryde, Cambridgeshire on the Midland and Great Northern Joint Railway between Wisbech and Peterborough. Originally built by the Peterborough, Wisbeach and Sutton Railway, it was opened for goods traffic on 1 June 1866 and for passengers on 1 August of the same year.

There was no passing loop at this station until 1906 when one was installed as part of the general upgrading of the line made to improve the King's Cross, Peterborough, Sheringham and Cromer services run in collaboration with the Great Northern Railway.

Passenger services were withdrawn on 2 December 1957, but goods trains travelling between Murrow and the brickworks at Dogsthorpe, near Peterborough, continued to pass through the station until 31 October 1965.

Preceding station	Disused railways	Following station
Thorney	Midland and Great Northern; Peterborough Line	Murrow East
