= Thorney Abbey =

Monastery in Cambridgeshire, England

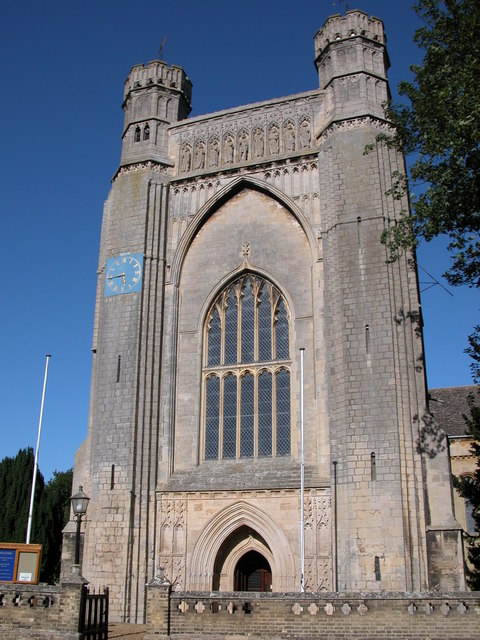
- Thorney Abbey Church

- Location within Cambridgeshire

Monastery information
- Order: Benedictine
- Established: 972
- Disestablished: 1539

Architecture
- Heritage designation: Grade I listed building 1331263
- Designated date: 22 October 1952

Site
- Location: Thorney, Cambridgeshire
- Coordinates: 52.6204°N 0.1072°W
- Website: thorneyabbey.co.uk

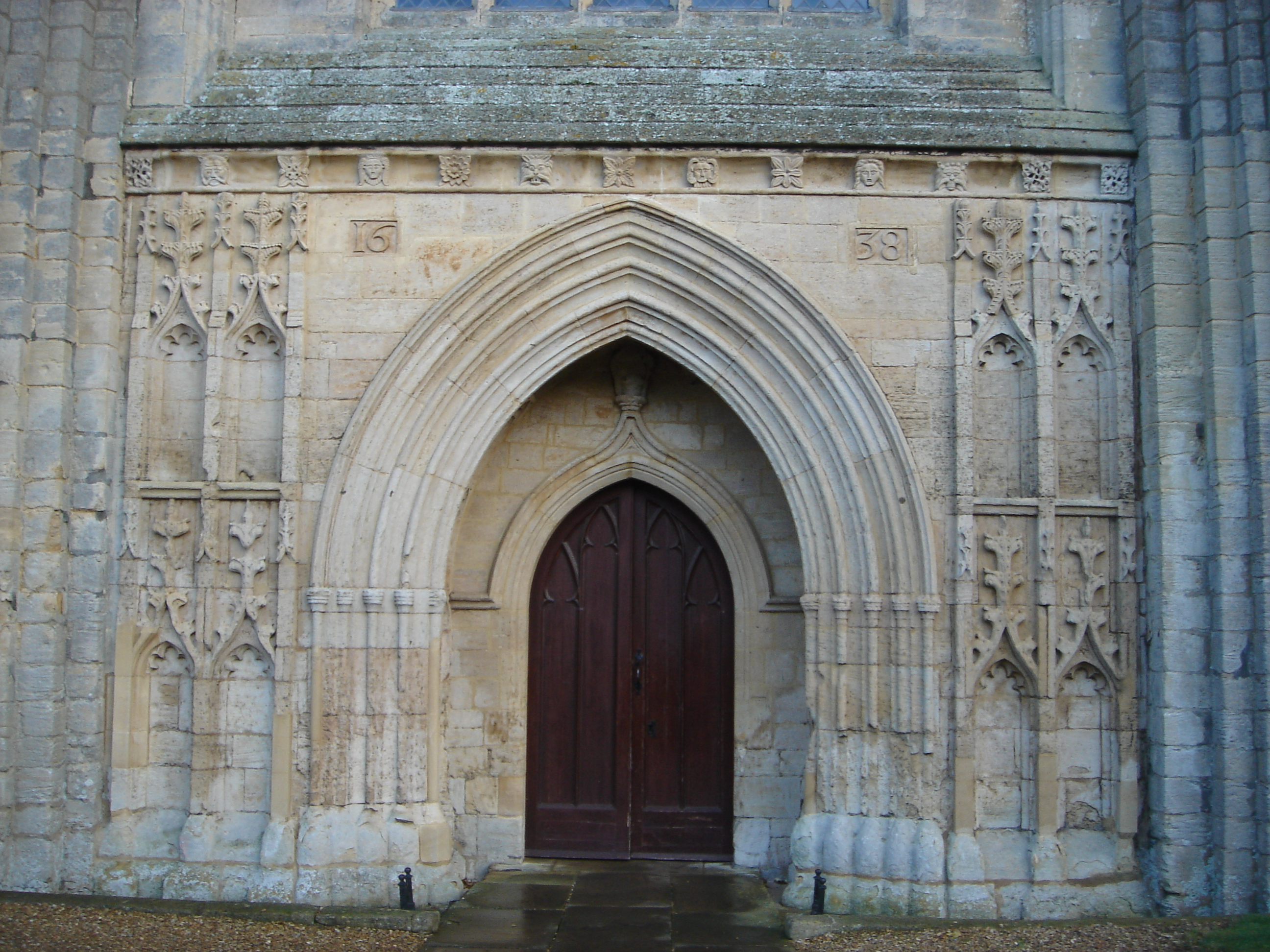
The central door of the Thorney Abbey's west front.

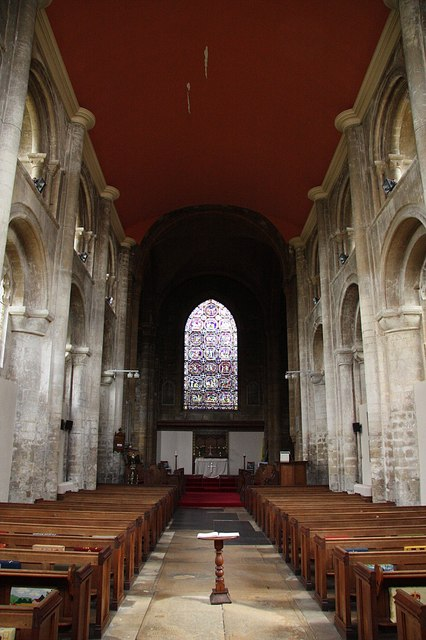
Interior of the abbey, looking east

Thorney Abbey, now the Church of St Mary and St Botolph, was a medieval English Benedictine monastery at Thorney, Cambridgeshire in The Fens of Cambridgeshire, United Kingdom

== History ==
The earliest documentary sources refer to a mid-7th century hermitage destroyed by a Viking incursion in the late 9th century. A Benedictine monastery was founded in the 970s, and a huge rebuilding programme followed the Norman Conquest of 1066. A new church was begun under the abbacy of Gunther of Le Mans, appointed in 1085. It was in use by 1089, but not entirely finished until 1108. Henry I was a benefactor of the abbey; a writ of his survives ordering the return of the manor of Sawbridge in Warwickshire to the abbey "and there is to be no complaint of injustice".

The focus of the settlement shifted away from the fen edge in the late 12th or early 13th century, the earlier site becoming a rubbish dump, perhaps because of encroaching water. It was reoccupied in the 13th and 14th centuries, when clay layers were laid down to provide a firm foundation for the timber buildings. More substantial buildings were erected in the 16th century and these are thought to have been part of an expanding abbey complex, perhaps for use as guesthouses, stables, or workshops.

Many of Thorney Abbey's buildings disappeared without trace after the Dissolution of the Monasteries. Its last abbot, Robert Blythe, was a supporter of the King, having signed a letter to the pope urging that his divorce should be allowed. He was rewarded with a pension of £200 a year. The abbey was surrendered to the king's commissioners on 1 December 1539, and most its buildings were later demolished and the stone reused. The site was granted to John Russell, 1st Earl of Bedford in 1549/50.

The nave of the church survived, and was restored as the Parish Church of St Mary and St Botolph in 1638. At this date the aisles were demolished and the arcade openings walled up. Some stained glass was installed that possibly came from the Steelyard, the London trading base of the Hanseatic League. The present east end, in the Norman style, is by Edward Blore, and dates from 1840 to 1841. The church is a Grade I listed building.

There is a model of the monastery in the Thorney Museum.

The name Thorney Abbey is also given to a Grade I listed house, partly late sixteenth and partly seventeenth century, in the village of Thorney.

== Burials ==
As a large abbey of Anglo-Saxon England a number of saints have been buried and venerated in Thorney, including:

- Athwulf of Thorney
- Benedict Biscop
- Botwulf of Thorney
- Cissa of Crowland
- Herefrith of Thorney
- Huna of Thorney
- Tancred of Thorney 9th century East Anglian martyr
- Torthred of Thorney brother of Tancred
- Tova
- Wihtred of Thorney
- Albinus of Thorney an Anglo-Saxon bishop and saint, buried in Thorney.

== Excavation ==
Excavation was undertaken in 2002 prior to redevelopment, by University of Leicester Archaeological Services. This focused on the northern edge of the former island. As well as pottery, animal bone and roofing material, a large deposit of 13th and 14th century painted glass was found in and around the buildings. The intricate designs were of very high quality.

== See also ==
- List of English abbeys, priories and friaries serving as parish churches

== Sources ==
- Thomas, J. (2006). Thorney Abbey discovered? Current Archaeology 204: 619
