= Chadwell =

Chadwell may refer to:

== Locations ==
- Chadwell, Leicestershire
- Chadwell, Shropshire
- Chadwell Heath in the London Boroughs of Barking-and-Dagenham, and Redbridge
- Chadwell Springs in Hertfordshire - one of the sources of the New River
- Chadwell St Mary in Thurrock

== People with the surname ==
- Jamey Chadwell (born 1977), American football coach
- William Chadwell (born 1614), English lawyer and politician

== See also ==
- Shadwell (disambiguation)
