= Thorney, Cambridgeshire =

Village in Cambridgeshire, England

Coordinates: 52.62179°N 0.10595°W

Thorney
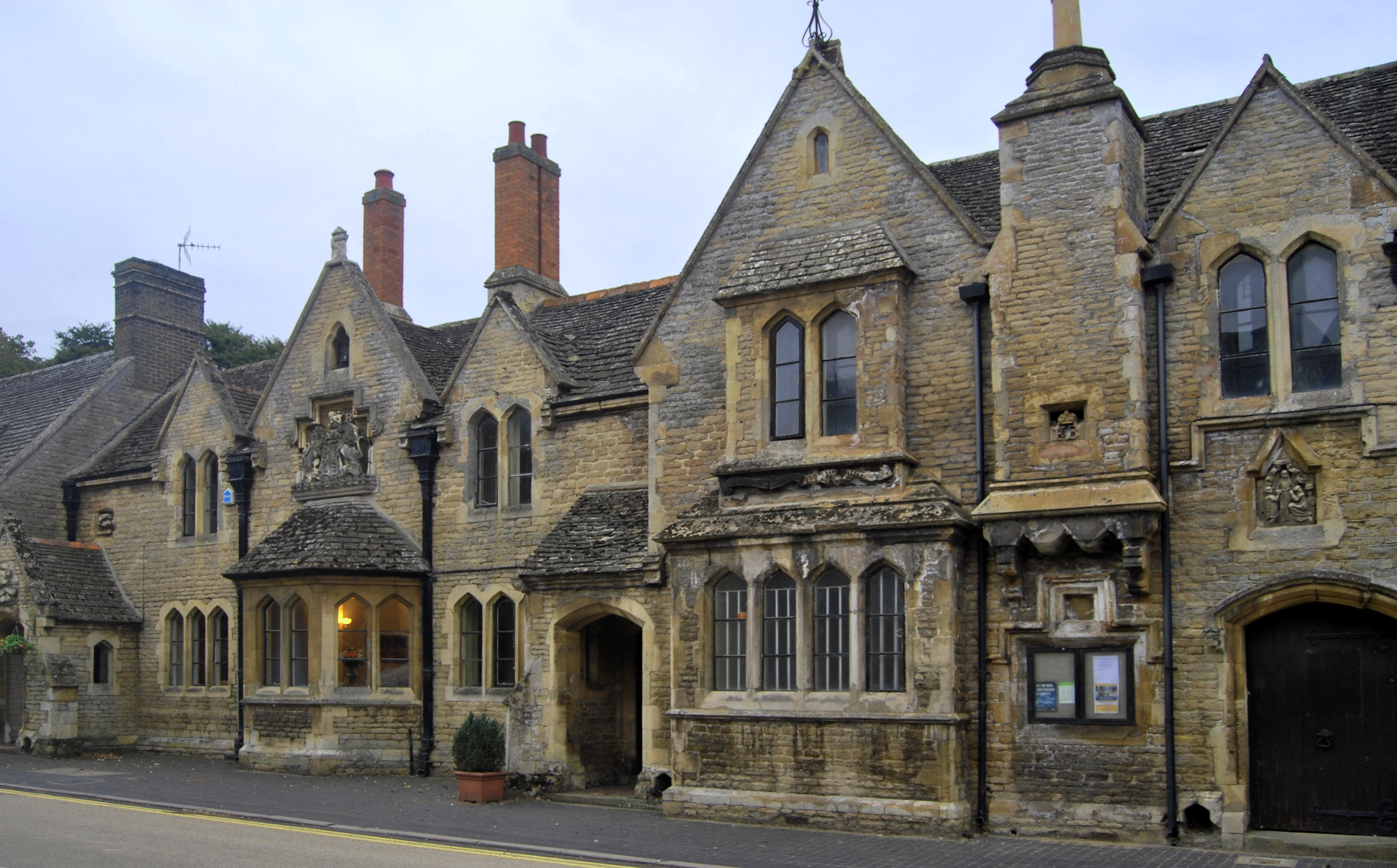
- Old Post Office, Thorney

- Location within Cambridgeshire
- Population: 2,401 (2011)
- OS grid reference: TF342039
- Unitary authority: Peterborough
- Ceremonial county: Cambridgeshire
- Region: East
- Country: England
- Sovereign state: United Kingdom
- Post town: PETERBOROUGH
- Postcode district: PE6
- Dialling code: 01733
- UK Parliament: Peterborough

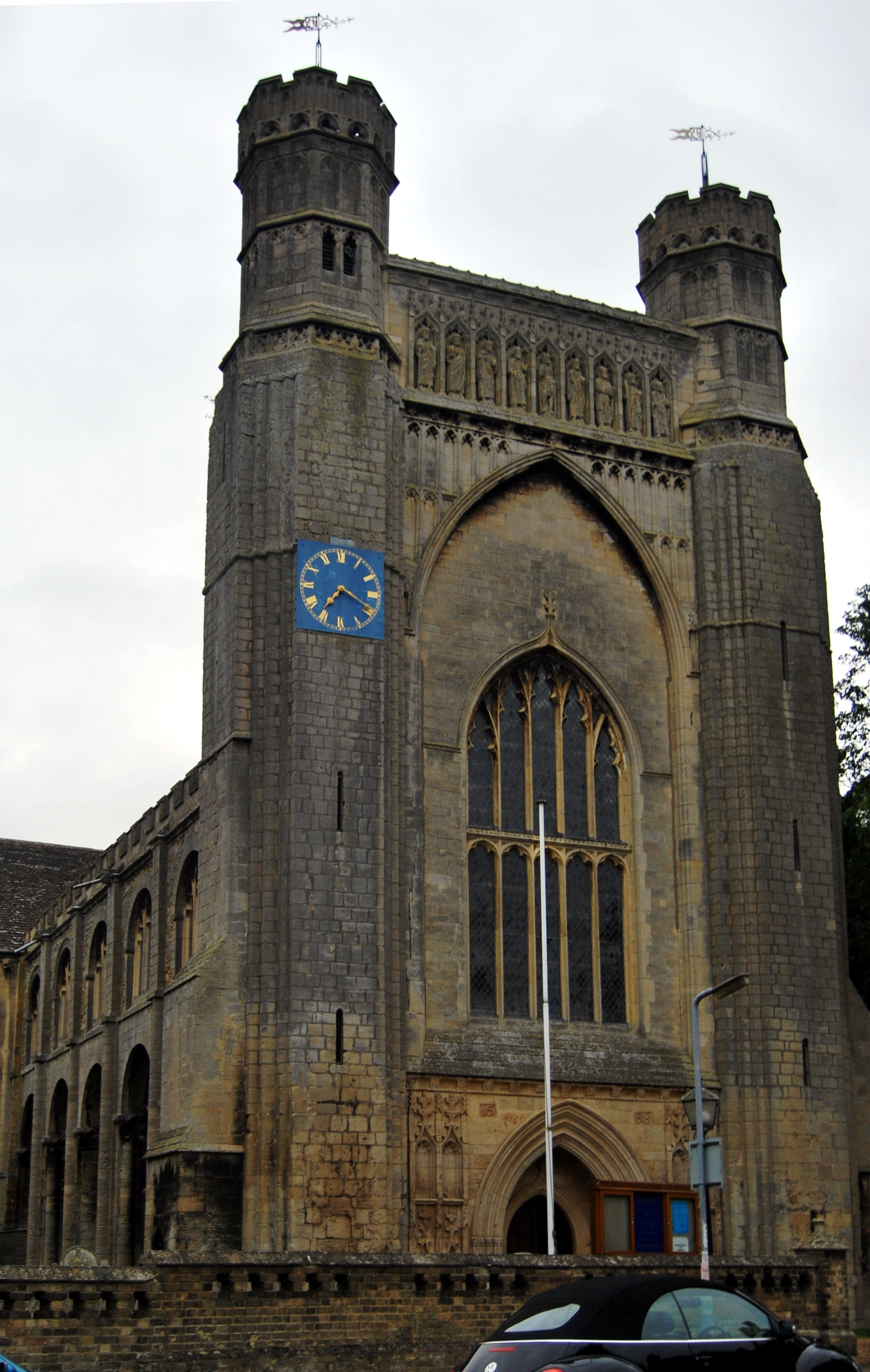
Abbey Church of St Mary the Virgin and St Botolph, Thorney

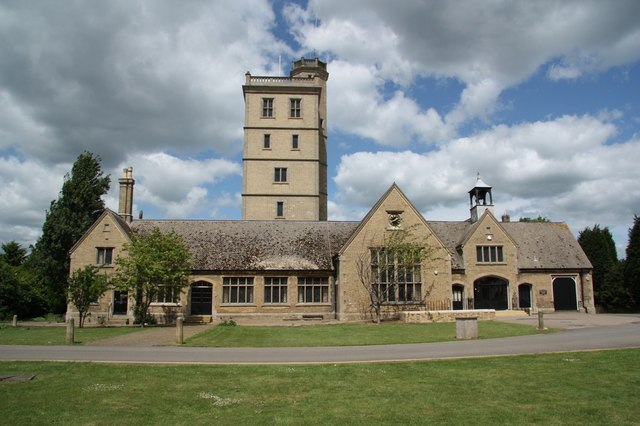
Bedford Hall

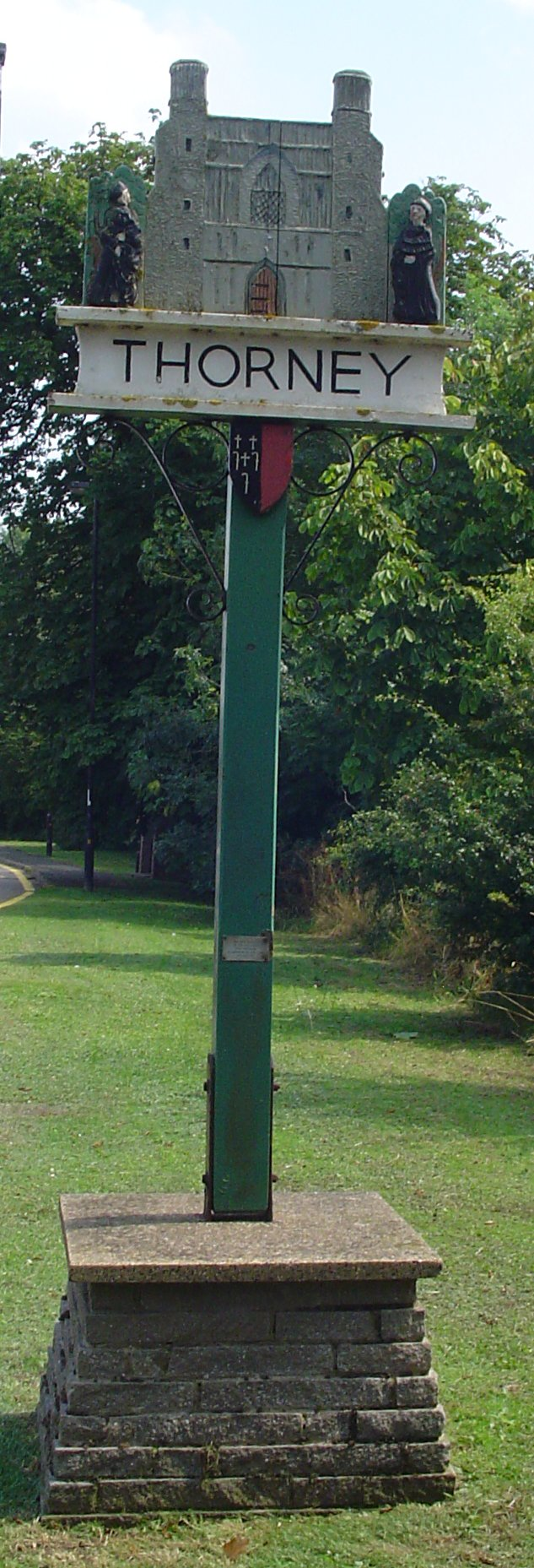
Signpost in Thorney

Thorney is a village in the Peterborough unitary authority in the ceremonial county of Cambridgeshire, England. Located around eight miles (13 km) east of Peterborough city centre, on the A47.

Historically in the Isle of Ely, Thorney was transferred to the short-lived county of Huntingdon and Peterborough in 1965 and became part of the Peterborough district in 1974, on the merger into Cambridgeshire; the city became a unitary authority area in 1998.

== History ==
Thorney began as a Saxon settlement in about 500 AD. The existence of Thorney Abbey made the settlement an important ecclesiastical centre, and until 2014 was the most northerly point of the Anglican Diocese of Ely. By 2007 the previous Thorney Abbey church, now the Church of St Mary and St Botolph, was part of the Deanery and Diocese of Peterborough.

Following the Dissolution of the Monasteries the estate became crown property and it was granted to John Russell, 1st Earl of Bedford in 1550. At this time only a few hundred acres of the land was cultivatable. In the 1630s Francis Russell, 4th Earl of Bedford spent a reputed £100,000 draining the fens, bringing almost all of the estate and parish of nearly 18,000 acres (7,284 ha) into agricultural use. A community of Walloon Protestant refugees, originally from areas of Flanders that are now northern France, was settled here in the 17th century with their own church and minister, employing the ruins of the abbey for services in their own language. The Walloons had expertise in fenland drainage. The Russell family's rents from the Thorney estate increased from £300 in 1629 to £10,000 by the early 19th century. The family, whose main seat was at Woburn Abbey in Bedfordshire, occasionally resided at the manor house in Thorney village, which was known as Abbey House. The estate was sold to the tenants in 1910.

Much of the village was built at the command of the Dukes of Bedford, who wished to have a healthy place in which their estate workers could live. In the mid-19th century many buildings were added to the designs of the architect S.S. Teulon, himself a descendant of Huguenots.

The 7th Duke of Bedford's model agricultural village included a modern water supply and sewerage scheme. The neo-Jacobean Tankyard building, now known as Bedford Hall, included a 96 ft high water tower, erected in 1855, that supplied fresh water to the village. The building houses Thorney Heritage Museum, part of the Greater Fens Museum Partnership.

The windmill on the outskirts dates from 1787 and contains six floors; it originally had six sails. During the war four German prisoners of war used it as a base during the day while working the land.

Thorney railway station was on the old Peterborough to Wisbech line, with an additional station in the parish at Wryde. The station and the line were closed in the early 1960s. Little evidence to suggest a rail link now remains, apart from one set of wooden level crossing gates at the west side of Station Road; these gates are not the original ones, but replicas based on the rotten originals, installed by the developer that built houses on the site of the station yard in the early 2000s. The concrete posts are the originals, however.

The A47 bypass opened in Winter 2005.

=== Air accidents ===
On 28 August 1976, a United States Air Force Lockheed C-141 Starlifter, 67–0006, on a flight from McGuire Air Force Base to RAF Mildenhall crashed near the village; the aircraft entered bad weather and the pilots lost control of the aircraft. The accident killed all 18 passengers and crew on board. A memorial is maintained on Thorney Dyke, for the lost aircrew.

Panavia Tornado ZA605 crashed on Wednesday 10 December 1986. The aircraft had taken off at 6pm for night flying in Scotland and collided at 6.06pm, when turning north. The Tornado hit another Tornado ZA611, which flew back, with part of the wing missing. The Tornado crossed the A47, and skimmed rooftops, being seen by drivers. Five fire engines attended. The crew went to RAF Hospital Ely.

=== Wind turbines ===
In 2010, planning permission was given for two wind turbines on land at French Farm, near French Drove in Thorney parish. In 2011 REG WindPower announced plans to install a further four wind turbines at the French Farm site.

As of 2013, other windfarms are proposed at Gores Farm, Willow Hall, Nuts Grove and Wryde Croft.

== Community ==
The village's local school is the Duke of Bedford Primary School which is next to Wisbech Road. There is also a specialist school at Park House for children with special educational needs.

The village has a magazine called the Thorney Post, which is printed three times a year. The magazine has its own website.

== Notable people ==
- Alec Goodman – Grand National winning jockey 1852 on Miss Mowbray & 1866 on Salamander, lived here, farming at Bar Pasture Farm, English Drove Farm and Willow Hall Farm, although born in Upwell on 30 July 1822. First farmer on Thorney Estate to introduce steam ploughing in 1865. Moved to Nottinghamshire in 1879. Retired to Leamington Spa in 1884.
- Ron Jacobs – Rugby Union – played for England, Barbarians and Northampton. President of the RFU 1984 who took England on tour to South Africa also farmed in Thorney. Thorney RUFC play at Ron Jacobs Field.
- Pam Sly – 1,000 Guineas Stakes winning trainer in 2006 with Speciosa, the first British female trainer to win a Classic race.
- Vernon Watson aka "Nosmo King" (Music Hall act) – buried in Thorney Cemetery, father of Jack Watson.
- Jack Watson – actor who starred in Coronation Street, This Sporting Life and The Wild Geese was born in Thorney in 1915.

== See also ==
- Thorney Abbey
- Thorney Rural District
- Thorney railway station
