= Wandsworth Council (disambiguation) =

The Wandsworth London Borough Council, created in 1965, is a local authority in Greater London, England.

Wandsworth Council may also refer to:

- Wandsworth Metropolitan Borough Council, 1900 to 1965
- Wandsworth District Board of Works, 1855 to 1900
