= Brady Street (disambiguation) =

Brady Street is a road in East London.

Brady Street may also refer to:

- Brady Street Historic District, in Attica, Indiana
- East Brady Street Historic District, in Milwaukee

== See also ==
- Brady Street Cemetery, in East London
- Brady Street Bridge, in Pittsburgh
