= Herne Hill =

Suburb of London

Coordinates: 51.4544°N 0.0936°W

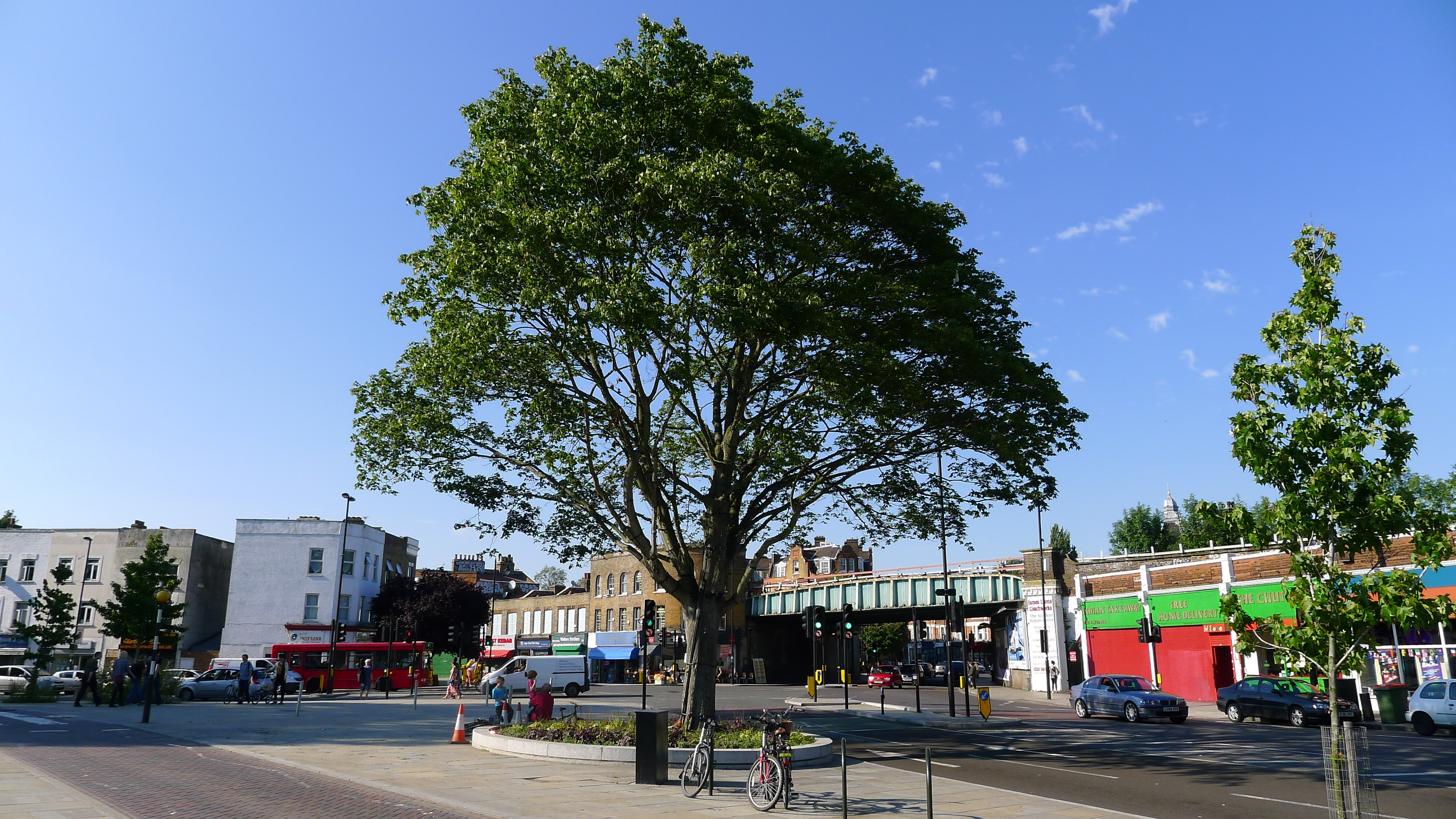
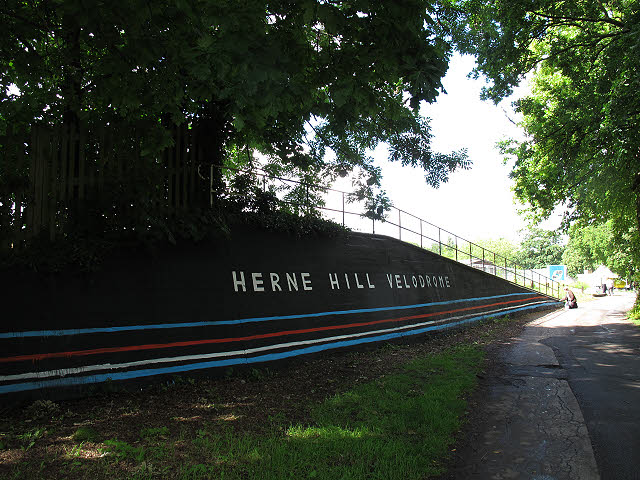
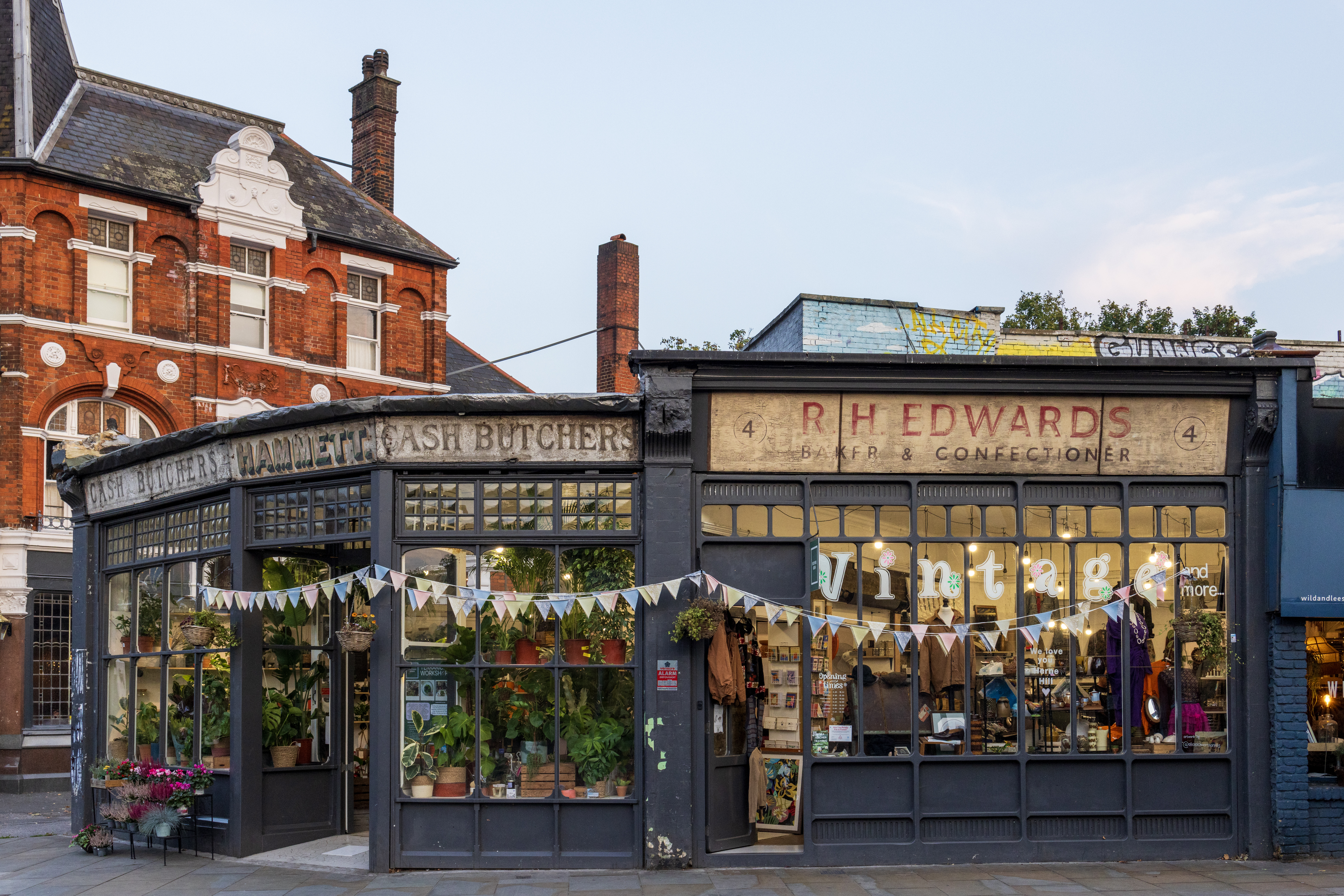
- Herne Hill Junction Velodrome Half Moon Lane Herne Hill Junction

- Location within Greater London
- OS grid reference: TQ325745
- London borough: Lambeth; Southwark
- Ceremonial county: Greater London
- Region: London
- Country: England
- Sovereign state: United Kingdom
- Post town: LONDON
- Postcode district: SE24
- Dialling code: 020
- Police: Metropolitan
- Fire: London
- Ambulance: London
- UK Parliament: Dulwich and West Norwood
- London Assembly: Lambeth and Southwark

Herne Hill (/hɜːrn hɪl/ is a district in South London, approximately four miles from Charing Cross and bordered by Brixton, Camberwell, Dulwich, and Tulse Hill. It sits to the north and east of Brockwell Park and straddles the boundary between the boroughs of Lambeth and Southwark. There is a road of the same name in the area (which is part of the A215), as well as a railway station.

== Toponymy ==
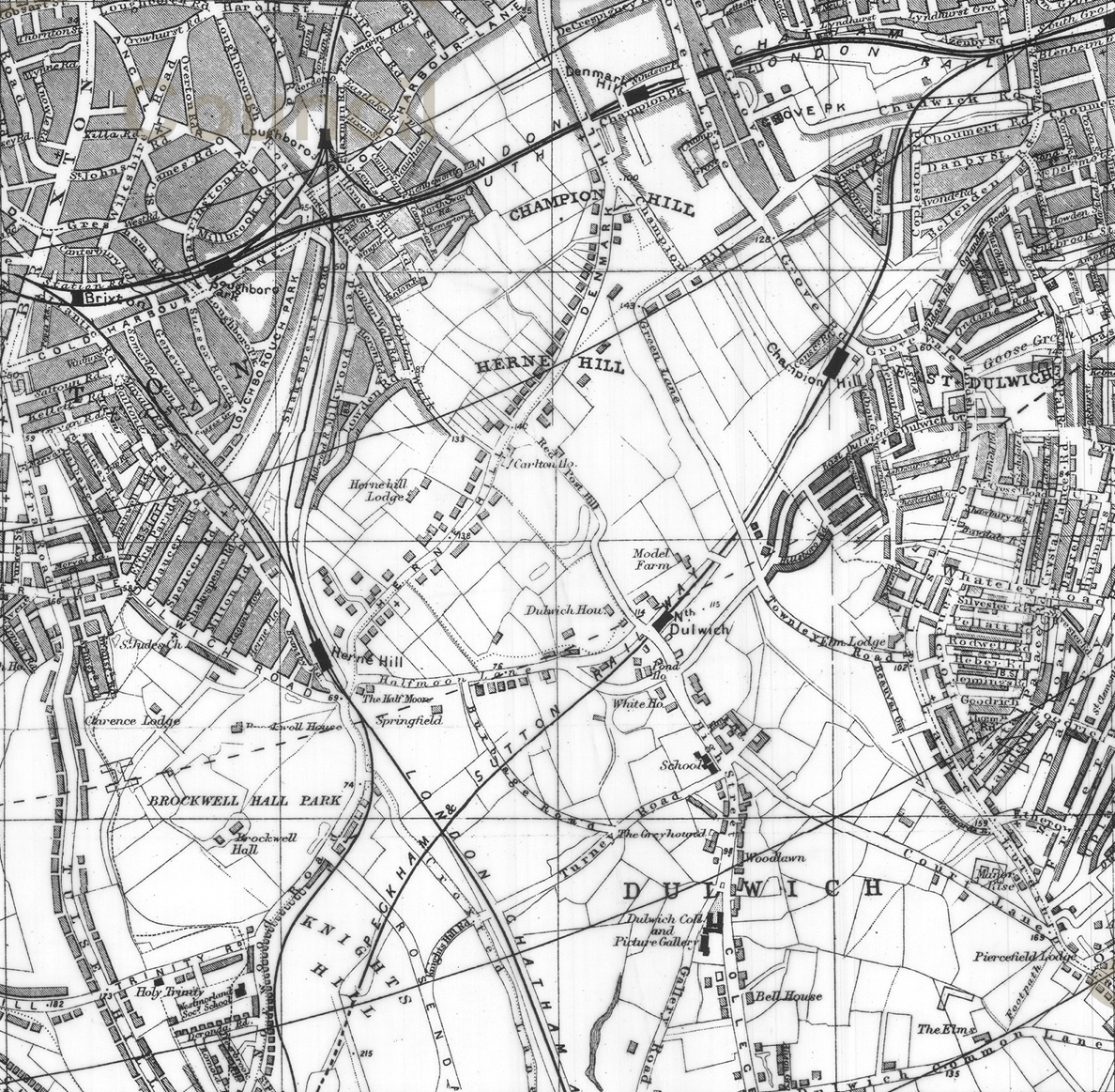
1888 map showing Herne Hill, bounded by Champion Hill to the north, Knight's Hill to the South, Brixton to the West and Dulwich to the East

In Rocque's 1746 map, the area is shown as "Island Green", probably reflecting the presence of the River Effra and smaller tributaries. Early references to the area also use the form "Ireland Green".

The earliest documented reference to "Herne Hill" is in two fire insurance policies issued by the Sun Insurance Company in 1792 (where the spelling is "Hearns" and "Herns" Hill).

== History ==
=== 1291 – Manor of Milkwell ===
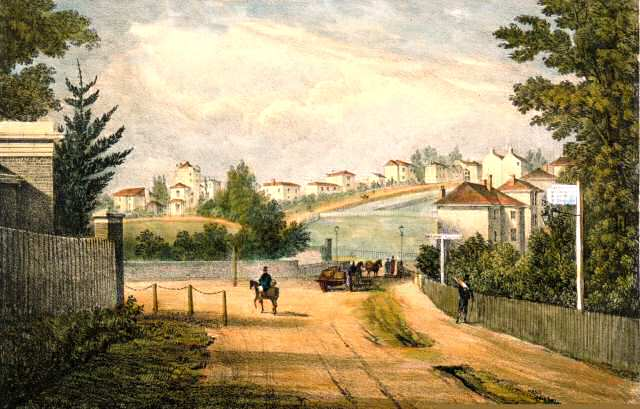
Herne Hill and Half Moon Lane in 1823.

A map showing the Herne Hill ward of Lambeth Metropolitan Borough as it appeared in 1916.

The area now known as Herne Hill was part of the Manor of Milkwell, which existed from at least 1291, and was a mixture of farms and woodland until the late 18th century. It was divided between the ancient parishes of Camberwell and Lambeth.

=== 1783 – Samuel Sanders ===
In 1783, Samuel Sanders (a timber merchant) bought the land now occupied by Denmark Hill and Herne Hill from the Manor; he then began granting leases for large plots of land to wealthy families.

=== Mid-19th century ===
By the mid-19th century, the road from the modern Herne Hill Junction to Denmark Hill was lined with substantial villas set in spacious grounds and the area had become a prosperous suburb for the merchant class. (John Ruskin grew up, from the age of 4, in a house on Herne Hill, until moving in 1842 to a large villa on Denmark Hill).

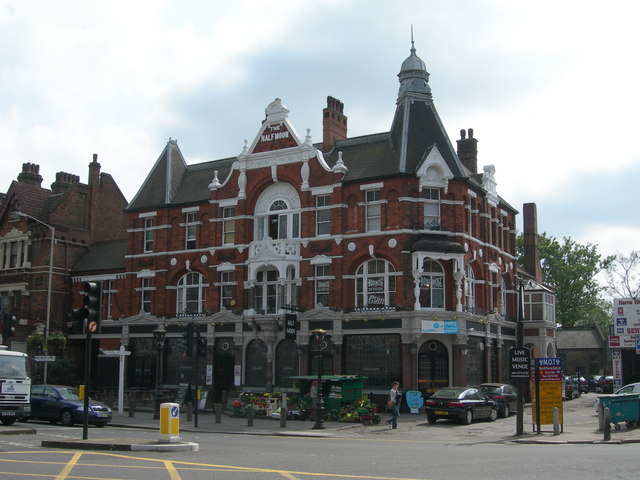
The Half Moon pub.

=== 1862 – arrival of the London, Chatham & Dover Railway ===
Herne Hill was transformed by the arrival of the London, Chatham & Dover Railway in 1862. Cheap and convenient access to London Victoria, the City of London, Kent and south-west London created demand for middle-class housing; the terraced streets that now characterise the area were constructed in the decades after the opening of Herne Hill station and the old estates were entirely built over.

=== World War II ===
During World War II five V-1 flying bombs fell at various sites in the Herne Hill area, causing six deaths.

=== August 2013 floods ===
During the early morning of 7 August 2013, an 88‑year‑old 0.9 m diameter water main on Half Moon Lane burst, flooding Herne Hill, Dulwich Road and Norwood Road along with 36 properties (including the Half Moon public house) to create a scene described as "biblical" by local residents. Thames Water admitted liability and estimated the total cost of the damage to be around £4 million. The Half Moon reopened in March 2017, following a vigorous local campaign to save it as a pub; Southwark Council has designated it an asset of community value.

== Local landmarks ==
=== Brockwell Park ===
The area is home to the 50.8 ha (125.5 acres) Brockwell Park. Near a hilltop in Brockwell Park stands the Grade II* listed Brockwell Hall, which was built in 1811–13 to the design of the architect David Riddall Roper. The hall and the land surrounding it were opened to the public in 1891 after being purchased by London County Council. Brockwell Park hosts the annual Lambeth Country Show and was the site of London's Gay Pride festival for several years in the 1990s. The park also houses Brockwell Lido, a 1937 open-air swimming-pool that faces on to Dulwich Road, Grade II listed in 2003.

=== The railway station ===
Herne Hill railway station on Railton Road was opened by the London, Chatham and Dover Railway in 1862; the Gothic, polychrome brick station building was Grade II listed in 1998. The associated railway viaduct and bridges are also noteworthy; The Building News stated in 1863 that the viaduct was "one of the most ornamental pieces of work we have ever seen attempted on a railway" for its fine brickwork.

=== Herne Hill Velodrome ===
The Herne Hill Velodrome, situated in a park off Burbage Road, was built in 1891 and hosted the track cycling events in the 1948 Summer Olympics. Unlike most modern, steeply-banked velodromes, it is a shallow concrete bowl; as of 2010 the 'Save the Herne Hill Velodrome' campaign was seeking a way to secure the future of the site. The same park also has a football pitch and was the home of Crystal Palace F.C. from 1915 until 1918.

=== Sam Mussabini – 84 Burbage Road ===
A Blue plaque at 84 Burbage Road marks the former home of the athletics coach Sam Mussabini. In 1894, Mussabini was appointed coach to the Dunlop cycling team which trained at the Herne Hill Velodrome. In 1913, Mussabini was appointed coach to the Polytechnic Harriers at the Herne Hill athletics track, which ran round the inside of the Velodrome cycle track. Here he trained athletes, including the fourteen-year-old Harold Abrahams. Mussabini was later immortalised in the film Chariots of Fire, in which he was played by actor Ian Holm.

=== Conservation area ===
In recognition of the historical importance and specialist character of the area within its urban context, Stradella Road was designated as a conservation area, by Southwark Council in 2000, under the Civic Amenities Act of 1967. The conservation area consists principally of properties in Stradella and Winterbrook Roads and also includes bordering properties in Burbage Road and Half Moon Lane.

=== Public houses ===
The Half Moon public house in Half Moon Lane was built in 1896 (although a tavern has existed on the site since the 17th century) and was Grade II* listed in 1998. The pub was formerly a popular live music venue and hosted a boxing gym for more than 50 years. The freehold of the pub belongs to the Dulwich Estate. The Commercial in Railton Road was rebuilt in 1938, and is locally listed by Lambeth Council as an inter-war pub of architectural and historic interest.

=== St Paul's Church ===
The Church of St Paul on Herne Hill was originally built by G. Alexander in 1843 at a cost of £6,707, but dramatically rebuilt by Gothic architect G.E. Street in 1858 after a destructive fire, although the tower and spire were saved. It is now Grade II* listed.

=== Sunray Gardens pond ===
The lake in Sunray Gardens (at the junction of Elmwood Road and Red Post Hill) was originally the fish pond in the grounds of Casino House (a large estate established in 1796/97, demolished 1906); the adjoining Casino Estate still bears the house's name. The estate, now a conservation area, was built by Camberwell Borough Council after World War I, modelled on the garden suburb ideal and part of the drive to provide Homes Fit for Heroes.

=== Delawyk Crescent ===
Delawyk Crescent is a housing estate with an unusual Radburn layout, separating vehicle and pedestrian movements. It was built in the 1960s and 1970s on land from the Dulwich Estate.

=== Hurst Street Estate ===
Hurst Street Estate comprises two pentagon plan tower blocks, Park View House and Herne Hill House, both 19 storeys (52 meters) high which dominate the skyline of the area. Completed in 1968 by Lambeth Borough Council, they each contain 72 dwellings.

=== Carnegie Public Library ===
The Carnegie Public Library on Herne Hill Road (not to be confused with the much older road known as Herne Hill) opened in 1906 after a Lambeth librarian was awarded a grant from Andrew Carnegie for building a library within the Herne Hill area. It is also a listed Grade II building.

=== Sax Rohmer – 51 Herne Hill ===
A Blue plaque at 51 Herne Hill (by the junction with Danecroft Road) marks the former home of Sax Rohmer (a.k.a. Arthur Henry Ward), author of a series of novels featuring the fictional master criminal Dr. Fu Manchu.

== Politics ==
Herne Hill is represented on Southwark Council by councillors for Dulwich Village ward (two councillors) and on Lambeth Council by councillors for Herne Hill and Loughborough Junction ward (three councillors) and West Dulwich ward (two councillors). All three wards are currently represented by councillors from the Labour Party. Herne Hill is represented in the London Assembly by Marina Ahmad and in Westminster by Helen Hayes.

== Transport ==
=== Buses ===
The London bus routes are 3, 37, 42, 68, 196, 201, 322, 468, P4 school route 690 and night buses N3 and N68.

=== Rail ===
Direct rail services are available from Herne Hill railway station to Blackfriars, City Thameslink, Farringdon, St Pancras International, and St Albans (all via the Thameslink Wimbledon loop) and to Orpington, and Victoria (via the Southeastern Metro Bromley South line).

Nearby railway stations offer services to other destinations: London Bridge can be reached from North Dulwich and Tulse Hill; Denmark Hill has trains to Clapham Junction and Highbury and Islington via the London Overground's Windrush line. The nearest London Underground station is Brixton on the Victoria line. There have been past proposals to extend the Victoria line to Herne Hill station on a large reversing loop.

== Notable residents ==
- George Nicoll Barnes, Labour politician
- Elhanan Bicknell, merchant and art collector
- Sir James Black, Nobel Prize winning pharmacologist
- John Blades, glassware manufacturer, builder of Brockwell Hall
- John Braham, singer
- Horace Brodzky, Australian-born artist and writer
- Anita Brookner, novelist, winner of the Booker Prize
- Richard Church, writer and poet
- Judah Cohen, merchant and slave-owner
- Olivia Colman, actress
- Michael Crawford, actor, singer, comedian
- Henry Havelock Ellis, writer
- Hans Eysenck, psychologist
- Joel Fry, actor
- Andy Hamilton, comedian
- Harriet Harman, MP for Camberwell and Peckham
- Robert Hunt, Assistant Commissioner (Metropolitan Police)
- Ernie Izzard, British lightweight champion boxer, nicknamed "The Herne Hill Hairpin"
- Elly Jackson, lead singer of La Roux
- C.L.R. James, writer and political philosopher
- Reginald Victor Jones, physicist and Scientific Intelligence Expert
- Sam Beaver King, HMT Empire Windrush passenger and Mayor of Southwark
- Marie Loftus, music hall artiste
- Cecilia Loftus, actress
- Ida Lupino, actress and director
- Roddy McDowall, actor
- Eric Mottram, central figure in the British Poetry Revival
- James Nesbitt, actor
- Cathy Newman, journalist and news presenter
- Sam Mussabini, athletics coach
- Sinéad O'Connor, Irish singer, songwriter and activist.
- Jay Rayner, food critic
- Lillian Rich, film actress
- George Robey, English music hall comedian and singer
- Sax Rohmer, Creator of Fu Manchu
- John Ruskin, art critic and social thinker
- Mark Rylance, actor, playwright, and theatre director
- Sinan Savaskan, composer and educator
- Ed Simons, one half of The Chemical Brothers
- Micky Stewart, England and Surrey cricketer
- Anna Storace, singer
- Steve Waller, musician
- Jessie Ware, singer
- Mortimer Wheeler, archaeologist
