= The Commercial, Herne Hill =

UK historic public house

Coordinates: 51.45305°N 0.10268°W

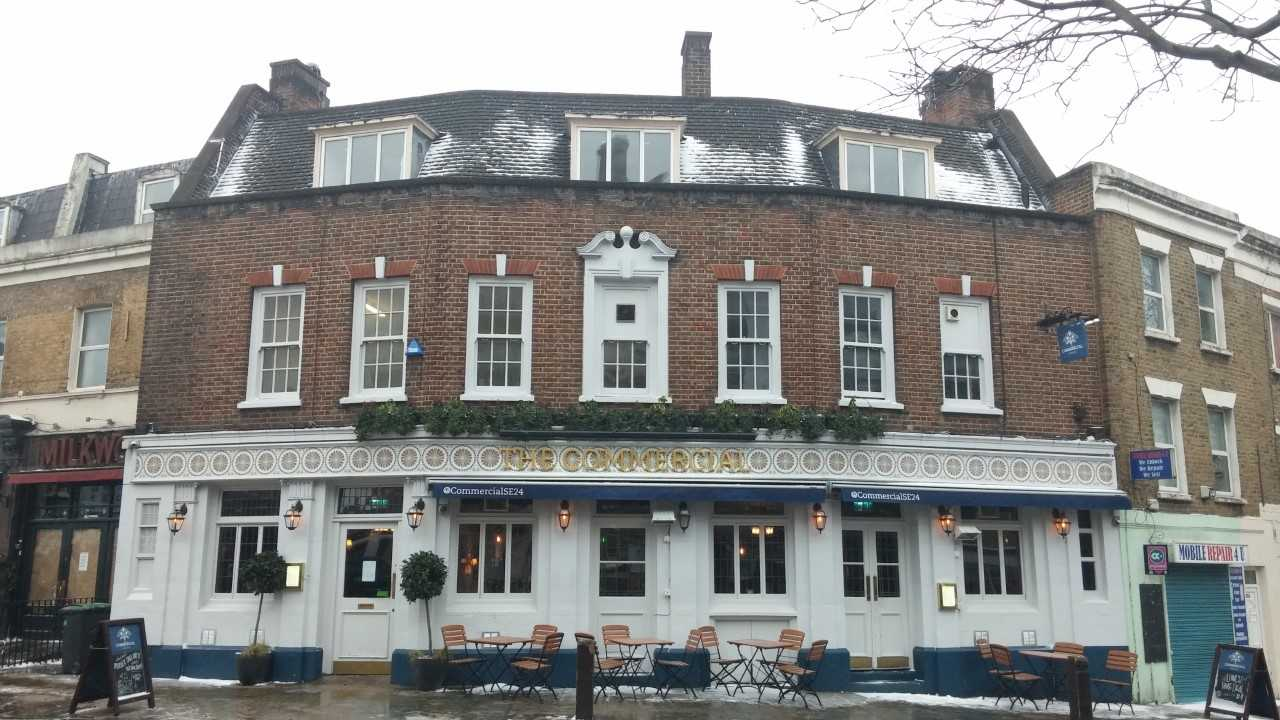
Photograph taken outside The Commercial pub in Herne Hill in 2018

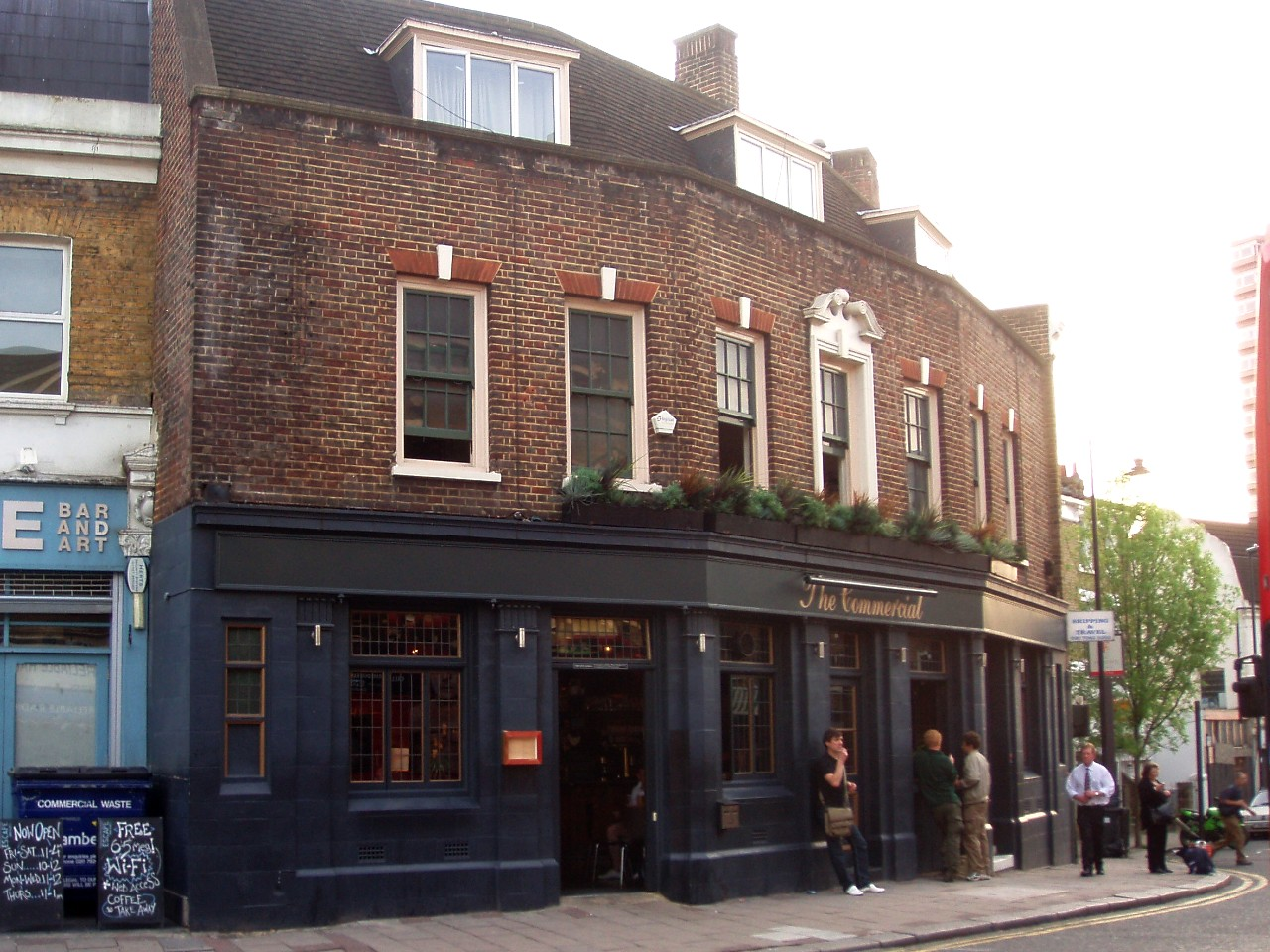
Commercial, Herne Hill, SE24 (2506724746)

The Commercial (also known as The Commercial Hotel) is a public house at 210-212 Railton Road, Herne Hill, London. It is cited in 'The CAMRA Regional Inventory for London' as being one of only 133 pubs in Greater London with a pub interior of special historic interest, most notably for its, "Original counters, bar-back, fireplaces and much fielded wall panelling" dating from the 1930s. In July 2016, Lambeth Council designated The Commercial as a locally-listed heritage asset of architectural or historic interest, being described as a, "Two-storey Neo Georgian style inter-war pub with a three-part convex façade which follows the curve of the building line".

== History ==
The history of The Commercial dates from development of the area around Herne Hill railway station, which opened in 1862. The 1870 Ordnance Survey Map shows a cluster of new commercial development around the front of the railway station captioned ‘Commercial Place’, although the first direct reference to 'The Commercial Hotel' as licensed premises dates to 1876. An "Important Notice" in the South London Chronicle on 6 September 1876 states that, "F. Mole, Family Wine and Spirit Merchant, Commercial Hotel, Herne Hill Station, Dulwich Begs inform Commercial Travellers and the public generally that he has the Choicest Selection wines and spirits, bottled ales and stout". There is no record of The Commercial ever operating as an actual 'hotel', so it seems likely that this was added to give the pub status.

On 28 February 1880, the South London Press reports a court summons for disgraceful conduct for James Early, who acted in a disorderly manner and refused to leave The Commercial Hotel, Herne Hill, when requested to do so by Mr. Sparrowhawk, the manager. The 1881 Census records five people residing at The Commercial - the licensed victualler, Elizabeth Davies, the manager, John Sparrowhawk, and a barmaid, general servant, and potman. The Post Office Directory lists the publicans of The Commercial Hotel variously as Mrs. E. Davies in 1878, W. Cobley in 1896, Samuel Shott Death in 1904, and Clarke, Baker and Co. Ltd in 1944.

The 1881 Census also shows William Cobley as running the Ship York Tavern in Rotherhithe, but by the time of the 1891 Census, he is shown as living with his wife Sarah at The Commercial. The Proceedings of the Old Bailey show William Cobley of The Commercial Hotel, Herne Hill, and his son Earnest William Cobley, giving evidence concerning a burglary at the pub by Robert Williams and John Tucker on 13 November 1893. The scene is described by Earnest, "On 17th October I went to bed about 12.45, after fastening up the house in con—junction with my dad—I came down about 7.40 a.m., and found the place in disorder, and a glass had been used for port wine — I saw the prisoners in the bar the night before". Both defendants were found guilty and sentenced to hard labour. A report of the local Conservative Ball in February 1889, states that members and their friends afterwards dined at The Commercial Hotel, Herne Hill, hosted by Cobley.

The rural environs of pub in the latter part of the 19th Century, are indicated by a Sporting Life report in March 1889 of The Surrey Fox Terrier and Rabbit Coursing Club adjourning to The Commercial Hotel, Herne Hill, "where the stakes were paid over, and with musical evening".

A case of counterfeit coinage is reported in September 1908 concerning Joseph Coombs, general dealer, who in company with his friend Boon, entered The Commercial Hotel, Herne Hill, where Boon put down a bad florin payment for drinks, which was immediately recognised by David Torr, a barman at the house, as counterfeit.

A 1912 photograph from the Lambeth Council Archives shows the name 'W. Colmer' displayed above the entrance to The Commercial Hotel, and a sign proclaiming "Bass on draught and in bottles". At the Lambeth Police Court on 19 December 1918, William Colmer, licensee of the Commercial Hotel, was summoned for refusing to sell certain whisky to a person duly authorised by the Lambeth Food Control Committee. On a second summons the defendant was proceeded against for serving whisky without having a label on the bottle from which it was served, stating the strength and maximum price.

A 1921 photograph taken looking down Railton Road, with Herne Hill railway station on the right, shows a large sign advertising bottled Worthington beer on the side of The Commercial pub.

In 1936, the pub is shown in the Burton upon Trent Bass Museum archive, as being a Licensed House of Wenlock Brewery Co. Ltd of Shoreditch. The current frontage and historic interior of the pub dates from its enlargement in 1938 to incorporate number 210 Railton Road. The Commercial is one of at least 5,000 pubs which were built or rebuilt by breweries in England during the inter-war years.

For a number of years in the 1970s and 1980s, The Commercial was noteworthy for its association with London Welsh RFC, who met in the pub, and the lounge bar was filled with at least 70 framed rugby shirts, ties and photos donated by leading London Welsh players, including Welsh international and TV commentator, John Taylor.

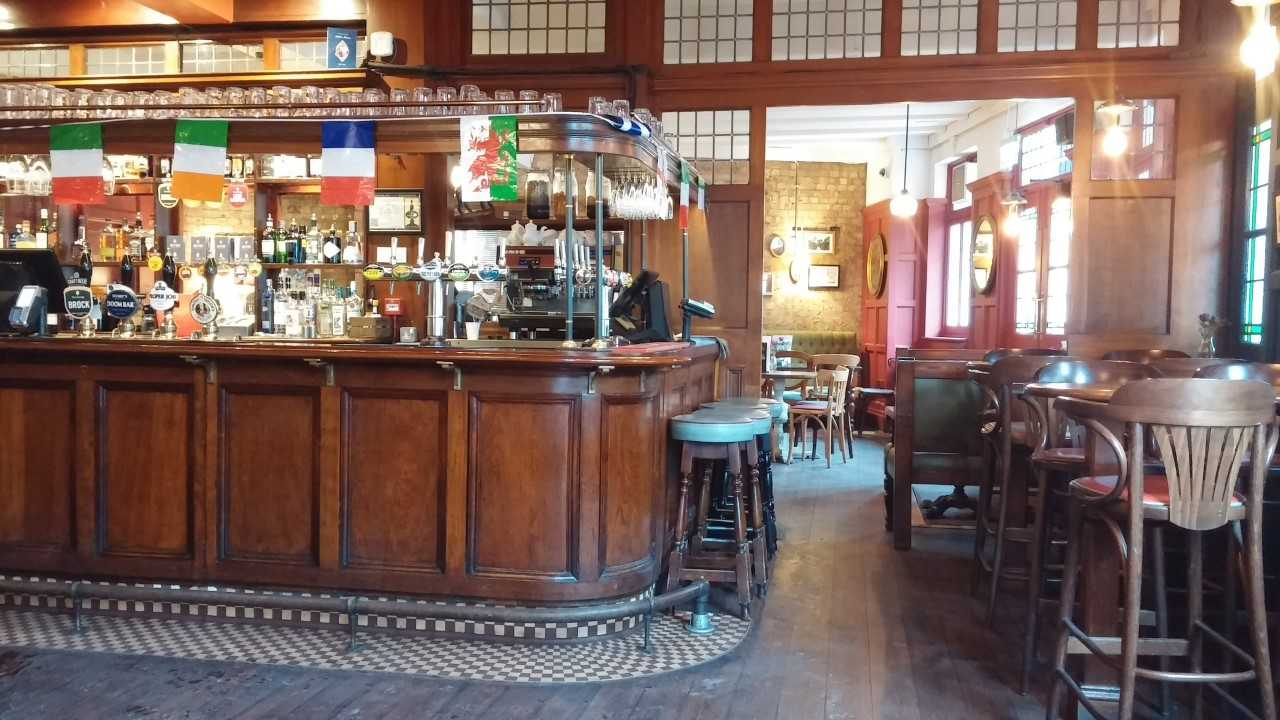
Photograph taken inside The Commercial pub in Herne Hill in March 2018, showing the historic 1930s interior saloon bar, bar counter and chequered gutter

The saloon and public bar of the pub were joined together in 2005. Whilst parts of the 1930s fielded wood panelling have been unsympathetically painted, the pub retains its fireplaces, bar-back (extending to the ceiling), bar and counter with round corner, and a rare example of a black and white chequered gutter ('spittoon trough') in the saloon. The Commercial continues to be a fine London example of an improved inter-war pub (rebuilt by breweries to increase size and appeal more to families and particularly women), of which increasingly few remain. The pub front is faience (now painted), which is also typical of the period. A blocked external doorway between the two sides of the pub may indicate a former off sales.

== The Commercial in popular culture ==
The Commercial in Herne Hill is cited as an influence by author John Ashton for his 2007 novel 'Dinner with Mandelson'.

In the 2018 book 'Today South London, Tomorrow South London', The Commercial is visited by the protagonists Dulwich Raider, Dirty South, Half-Life, and Cousin Max, where they sit outside and "survey the piazza".

The Commercial Pub in Herne Hill is specifically referred to as "fantastic" by comedian and presenter of The Mash Report, Nish Kumar, in a 2020 interview with New York Magazine.

In 2022, the poet Linton Kwesi Johnson was interviewed by The Observer in the beer garden of The Commercial.

== Recent history ==
The Commercial was named as South East London CAMRA 'Pub of the Season' in winter 2008/09. The pub also holds the Cask Marque Award for serving great quality real ale. It also runs a popular Monday evening quiz night.

The Commercial closed for a major refurbishment in February 2017, officially dropping the word 'Hotel' from its name when reopening a few weeks later. It is currently owned by Mitchells and Butlers, and includes a small beer garden at the back. It is listed by Mitchells and Butlers as one of its 'Castle' brand pubs, "decidedly individual, with a character to suit its community". The Commercial is also included in CAMRA's Good Beer Guide 2018.

The Commercial pub also features in a print celebrating Herne Hill's historic pubs, displayed on lamppost banners in the local area.
