= Judah Cohen =

Merchant and slave plantation owner

Judah Mordechai Cohen (1768 – 8 September 1838) was a Dutch-born British merchant and planter with interests in Jamaica. Owning over 1255 slaves on his plantations, Cohen was one of the largest slave owners in both Jamaica and the British West Indies in general at the time of the Slavery Abolition Act 1833. He had been involved in trade in the West Indies as a partner of his older brother Hymen Cohen since 1804.

== Biography ==
Judah Mordechai Cohen was born in Amsterdam, Dutch Republic to Mordechai Levie Cohen (1733–1830) and his wife Rachel Coenraad Blits, a Dutch Jewish couple born in Amsterdam who relocated to Herne Hill, Surrey, England. Along with his brother, Hymen Cohen (1762–1845), Judah Cohen was a co-partner in Hymen Cohen & Company which was listed in the London Gazette in 1804 and operated out of 58 Mansell Street: it dealt with trade in the West Indies. Another partner was Ellis Wolfe of Kingston, Jamaica.

In August 1822, a ship owned by the Cohens, the Vittoria, carrying coffee from their Jamaican slave plantations, was plundered by pirates operating out of Cuba and ended up being sold in Havana. The pirates also took from the ship expensive Nicaraguan wood, lignum vita and lancewood spars. Hymen Cohen, Judah Cohen, Andrew Cohen, Alexander Haim Cohen and Judah Hymen Cohen, the joint owners, reported loses of over £27,000 (worth £2.78 million in 2025).

According to the Legacies of British Slave-Ownership at the University College London, Cohen was awarded compensation for the freeing of his slaves under the Slave Compensation Act 1837 following the Slavery Abolition Act 1833. To raise the funds for compensating slave owners, the British Government took out a £15 million loan (worth £1.54 billion in 2025) from Nathan Mayer Rothschild and Moses Montefiore; the loan was finally paid off in 2015. Cohen was associated with forty-five different claims in total. The largest slave plantations he owned were Potsdam in St Elizabeth, Corby Castle in St Elizabeth, and Mons in Manchester. Cohen owned 1255 slaves in Jamaica and received a £23,946 payment at the time (worth £2.46 million in 2025). With all of his claims combined, Cohen was one of the people with the largest number of slaves in Jamaica particularly, but the British West Indies in general in 1833; a few did own more such as the Lowland Scots slave owners John Gladstone (with 2508) and James Blair (with 1598), but their interests were more associated with British Guiana.

Some of the slave plantations in Cohen's possession had been assigned to him by Nathan Joseph of Kingston, Jamaica, who had bought up a large number of holdings. Judah Cohen's brother and business partner, Hymen Cohen, also had a large number of slaves in Jamaica (1011 slaves in total) and was the recipient of a large payout after slavery was abolished.

== Personal life ==
Cohen was married to Grace Gomes da Costa, the daughter of Aaron Gomes da Costa (1776 – 15 Aug 1847). The couple had a large number of children, including Judah, Jacob (born 1793), Andrew (1795–1800), Miriam (born 1798), Sarah Frances (1799–1874), Fanny (born 1799), Rachel (1801), Sarah Esther (1803–1893), Albert (1807–1821), Eliza (born 1810), Abigail (1811–1872), Rebecca (born 1813), Matilda (1815–1901) and Henry Cohen (1818–1900). Cohen was buried at Brady Street Cemetery in Whitechapel in the East End of London, where he has a tombstone.

== See also ==
- History of the Jews in Jamaica
