= Wandsworth District (Metropolis) =

Wandsworth
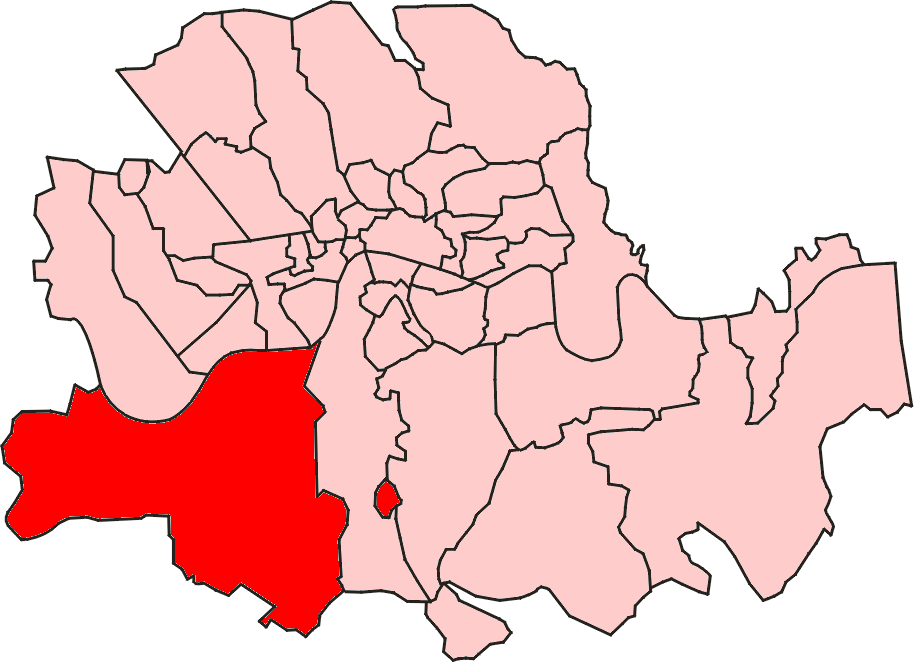
- District from 1855 to 1888 before Battersea was removed
- History
  - Created: 1855
  - Abolished: 1900
  - Succeeded by: Metropolitan Borough of Wandsworth
- Status: District
- Government: Wandsworth District Board of Works
  - HQ: Battersea (1855–1888); Wandsworth (1888–1900)

Wandsworth was a local government district within the metropolitan area of London, England from 1855 to 1900. It was formed by the Metropolis Management Act 1855 and was governed by the Wandsworth District Board of Works, which consisted of elected vestrymen.

The district was in the part of Surrey that was included in the area of the Metropolitan Board of Works. In 1889 the Metropolitan Board of Works area became the County of London, and the district board continued as an authority under the London County Council.

Since 1965 its area corresponds to the London Borough of Wandsworth and part of the London Borough of Lambeth, as well as part of Richmond Park that is now in the London Borough of Richmond upon Thames.

== Geography ==
The district comprised the following civil parishes:

- Battersea (1855—1888) excluding Penge exclave
- Clapham
- Putney
- Streatham, including Knight's Hill exclave
- Tooting Graveney
- Wandsworth

The district included the small Knight's Hill exclave of Streatham parish, but did not include the Penge exclave of Battersea parish.

== Governance ==
Under the Metropolis Management Act 1855 any parish that exceeded 2,000 ratepayers was to be divided into wards; as such the parish of Clapham within the Wandsworth District Boards of Works was divided into two wards (electing vestrymen): No. 1 or North (21) and No. 2 or South (15).

In 1873 as its population had increased the parish of Battersea was divided into four wards (electing vestrymen): No. 1 (18), No. 2 (21), No. 3 (21) and No. 4 (12).

In 1883 as its population had increased the parish of Streatham was divided into three wards (electing vestrymen): No. 1 or Balham (21), No. 2 or North Streatham (18) and No. 3 or South Streatham (9).

In 1894 as its population had increased the parish of Wandsworth was divided into six wards (electing vestrymen): Southfield (21), Northfield (15), Fairfield (24), Heathfield (15), Earlsfield (15) and Springfield (18).

== Abolition ==
In 1888 the Battersea parish was removed from the district under the Metropolis Management (Battersea and Westminster) Act 1887, and the Battersea Vestry became the local authority for Battersea.

The remaining district was abolished in 1900 and its former area became the Metropolitan Borough of Wandsworth, except for the Knight's Hill exclave of Streatham which became part of the Metropolitan Borough of Lambeth.
