= Knights Hill =

Knights Hill or Knight's Hill could refer to:

- Knights Hill (New South Wales), Australia
- Knight's Hill, Tulse Hill, northernmost of two hills in Lambeth, London and former exclave of Streatham
- Knight's Hill, West Norwood, road and southernmost of two hills in Lambeth, London
- Knight's Hill (ward), an electoral ward in Lambeth, London
