= London Borough of Lambeth =

London borough in the United Kingdom

- London borough
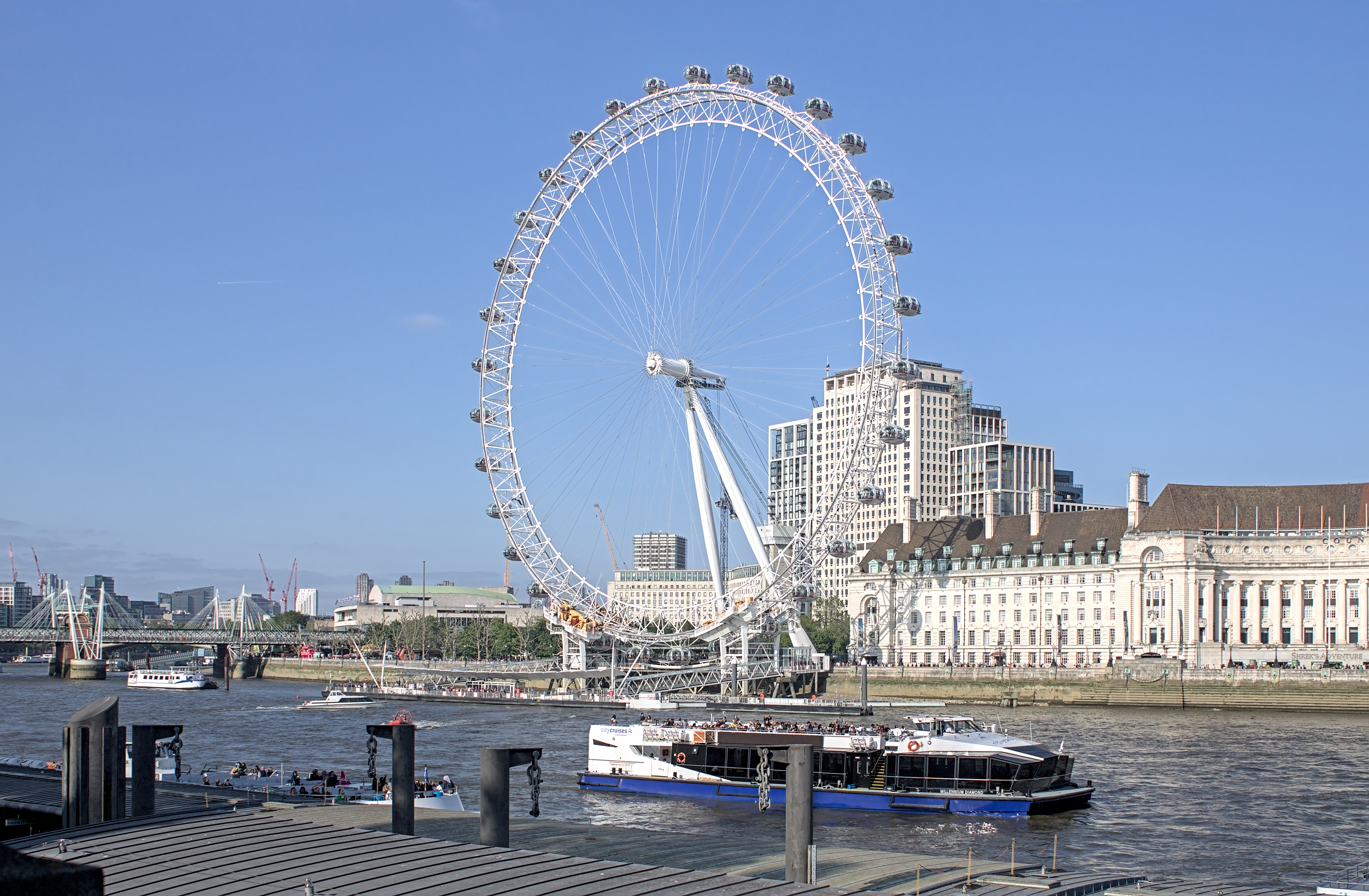
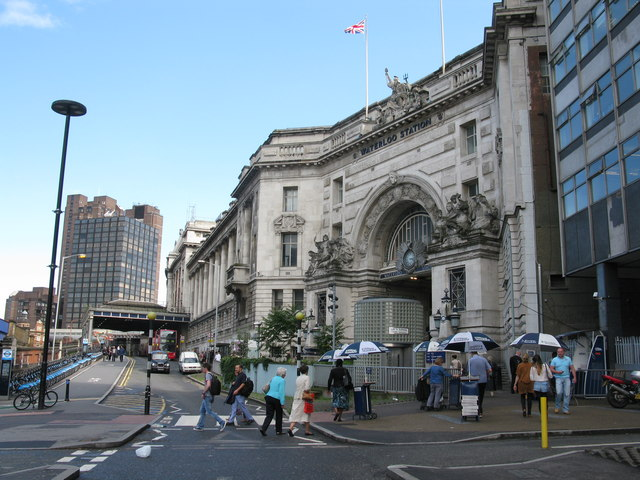
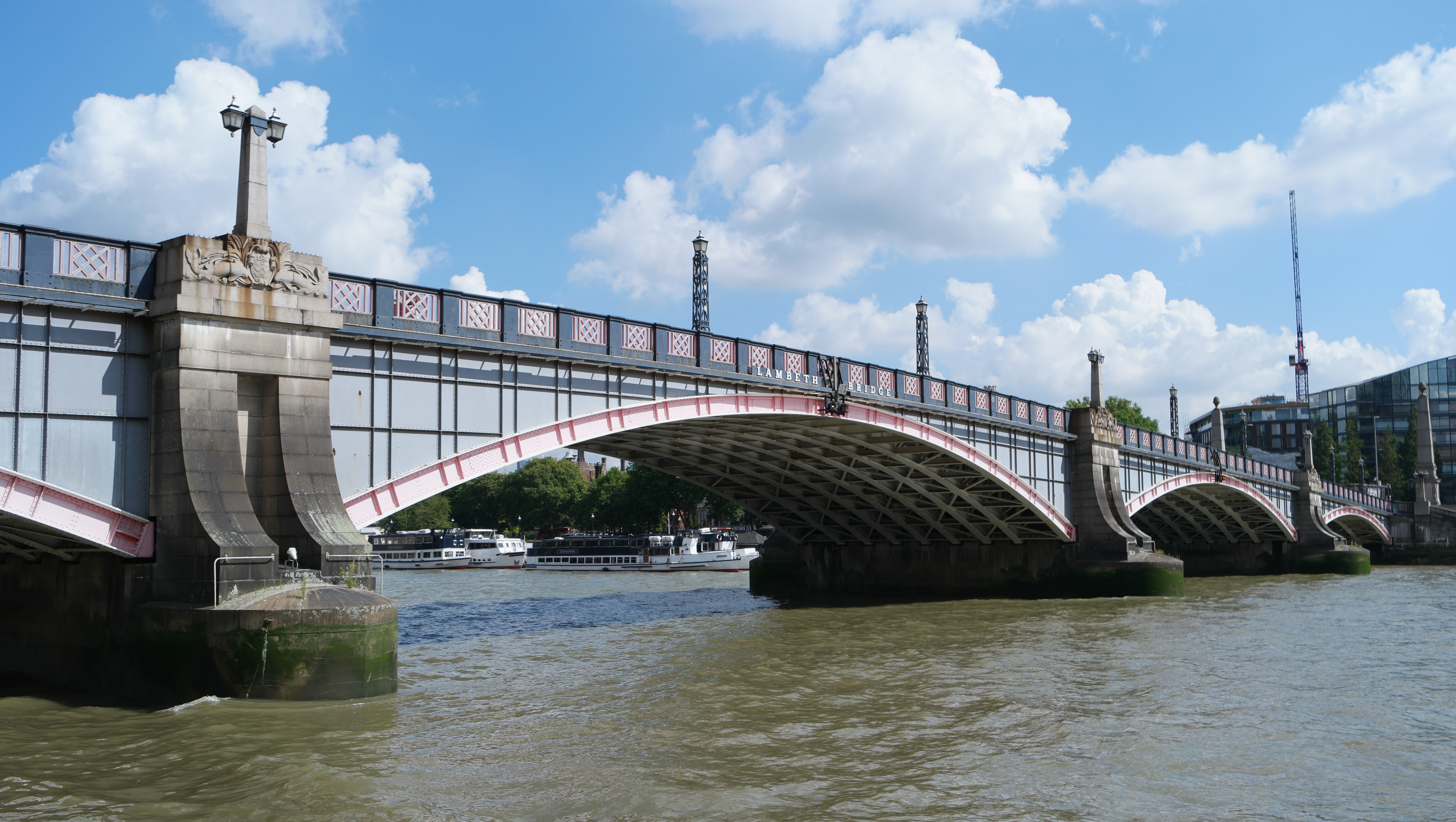
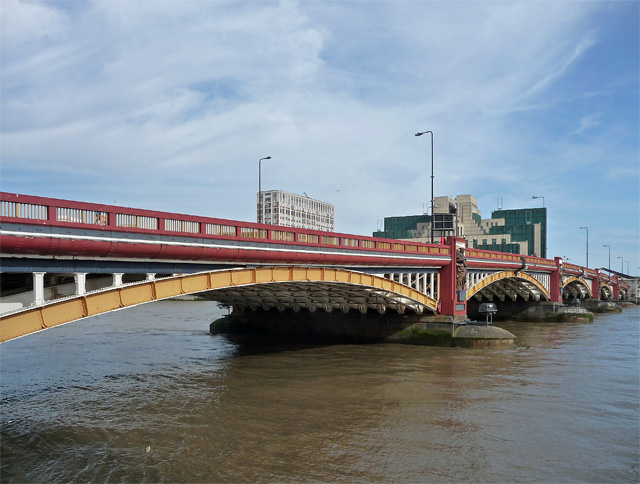
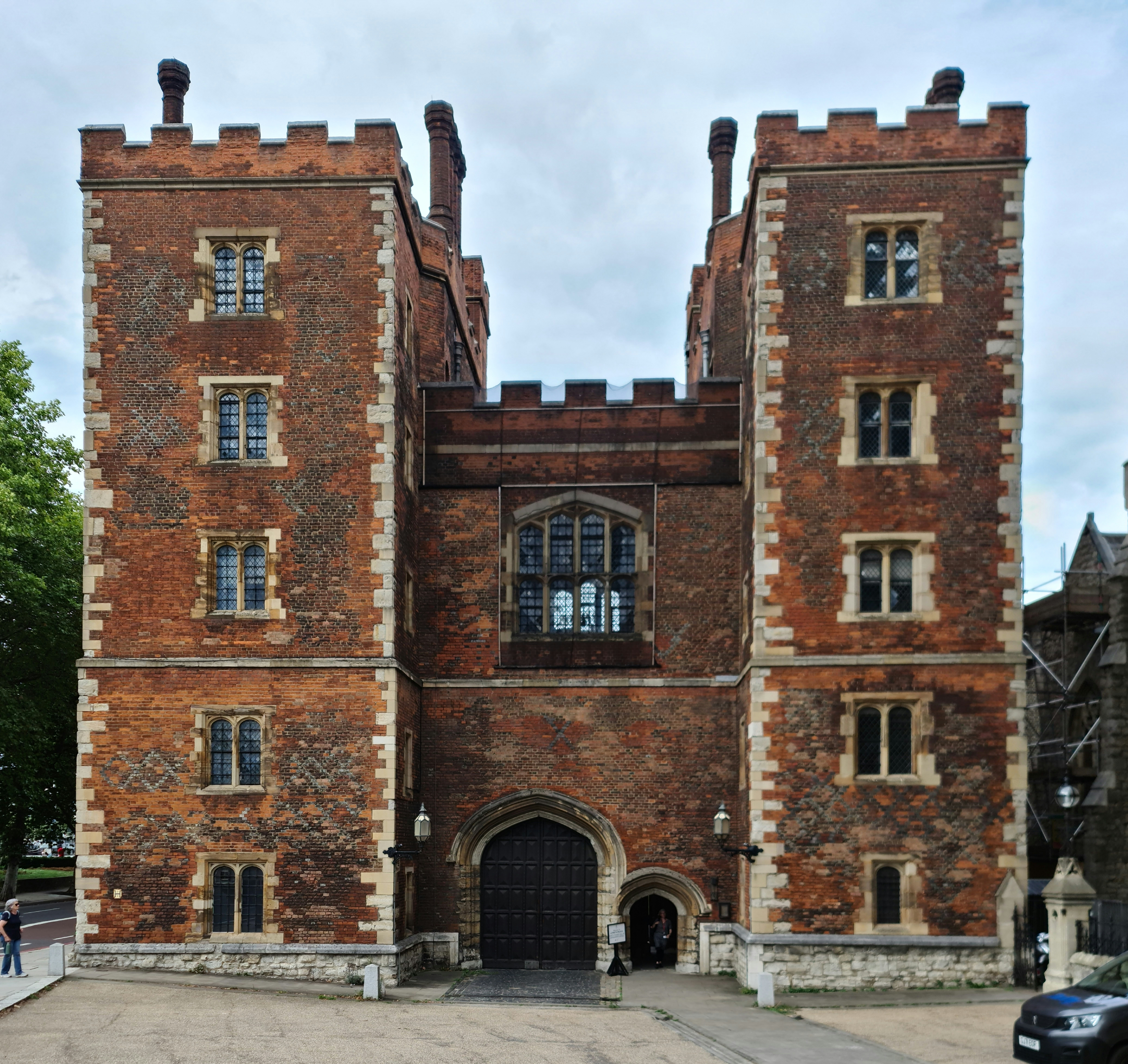
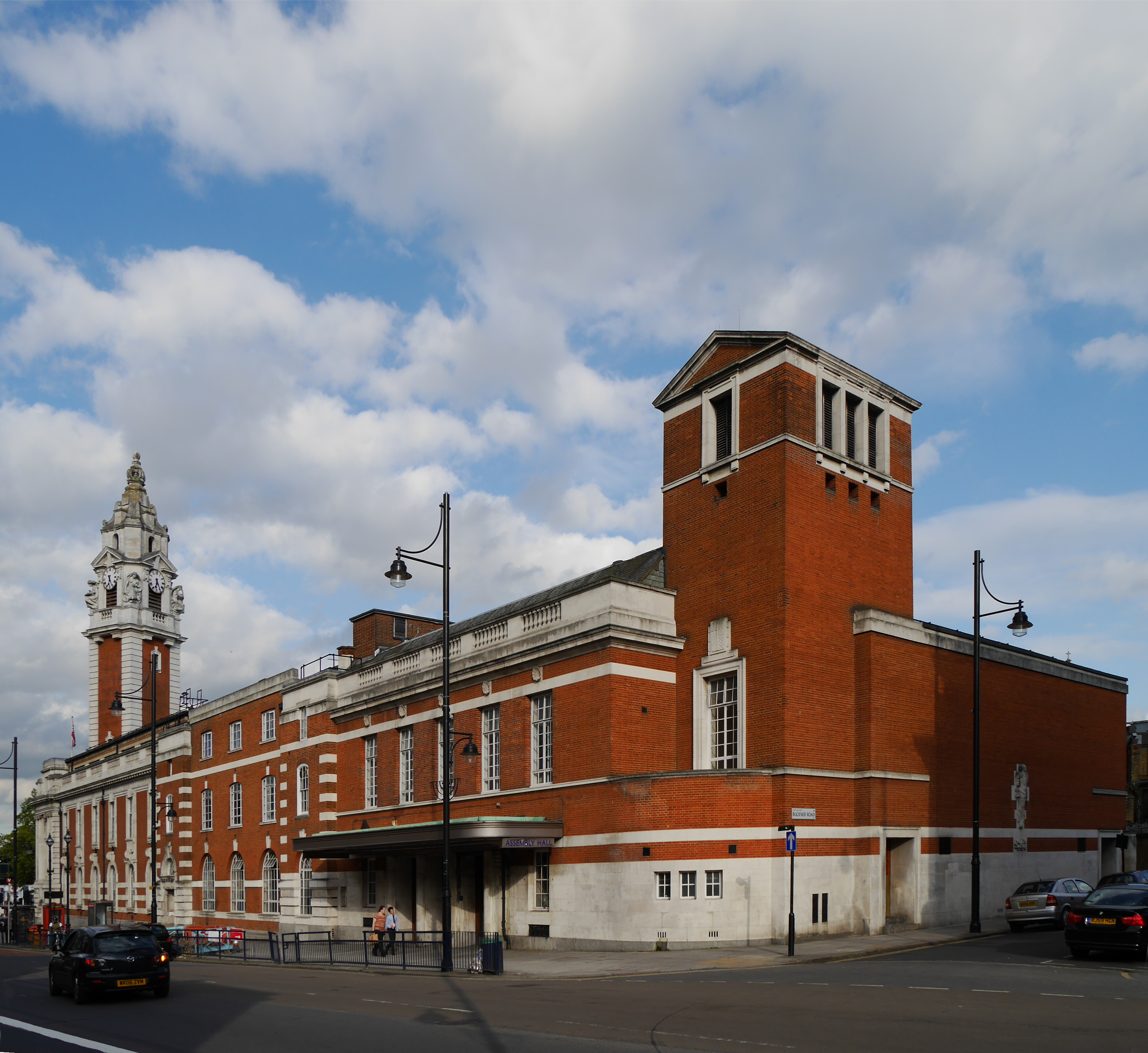
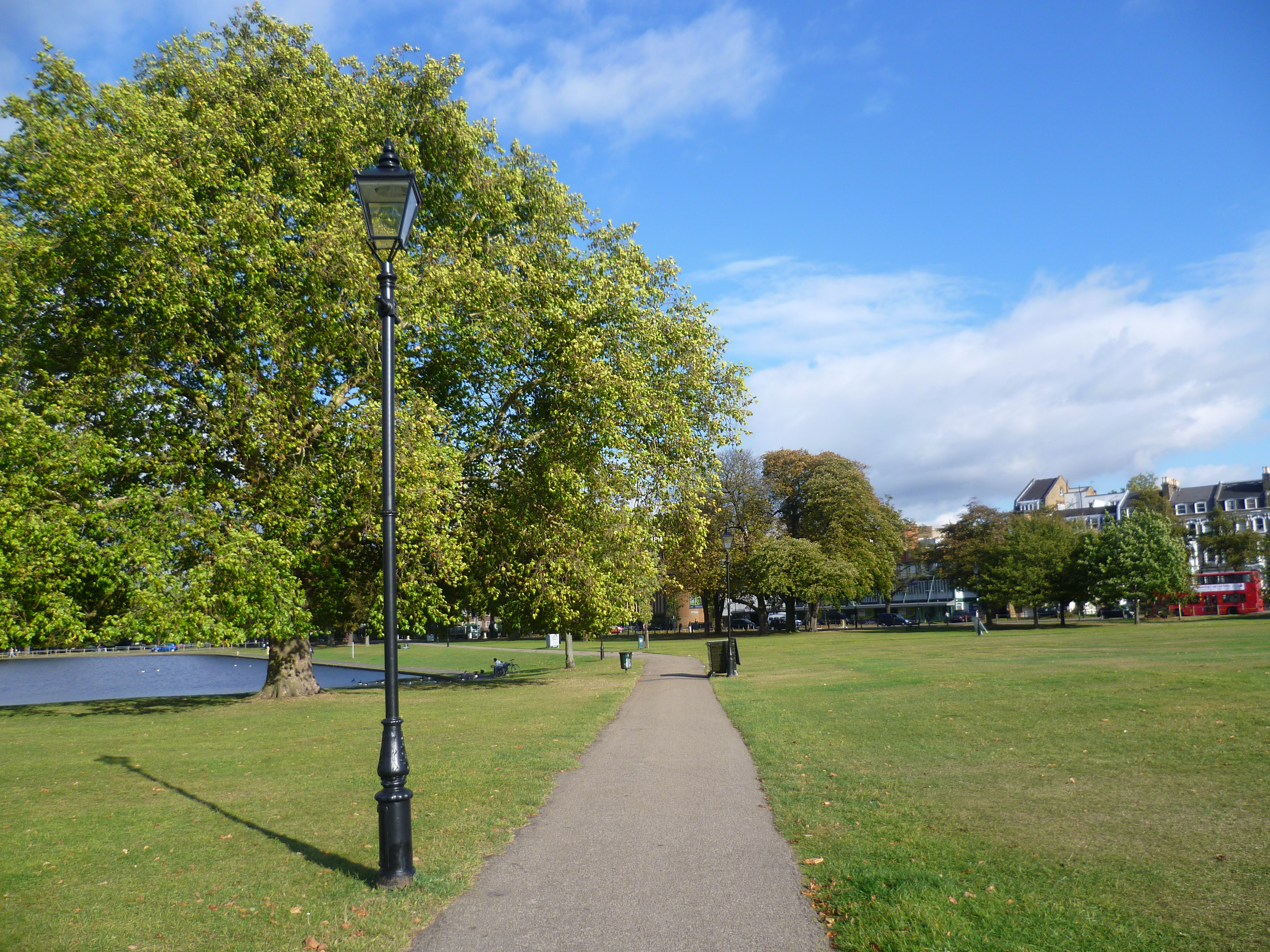
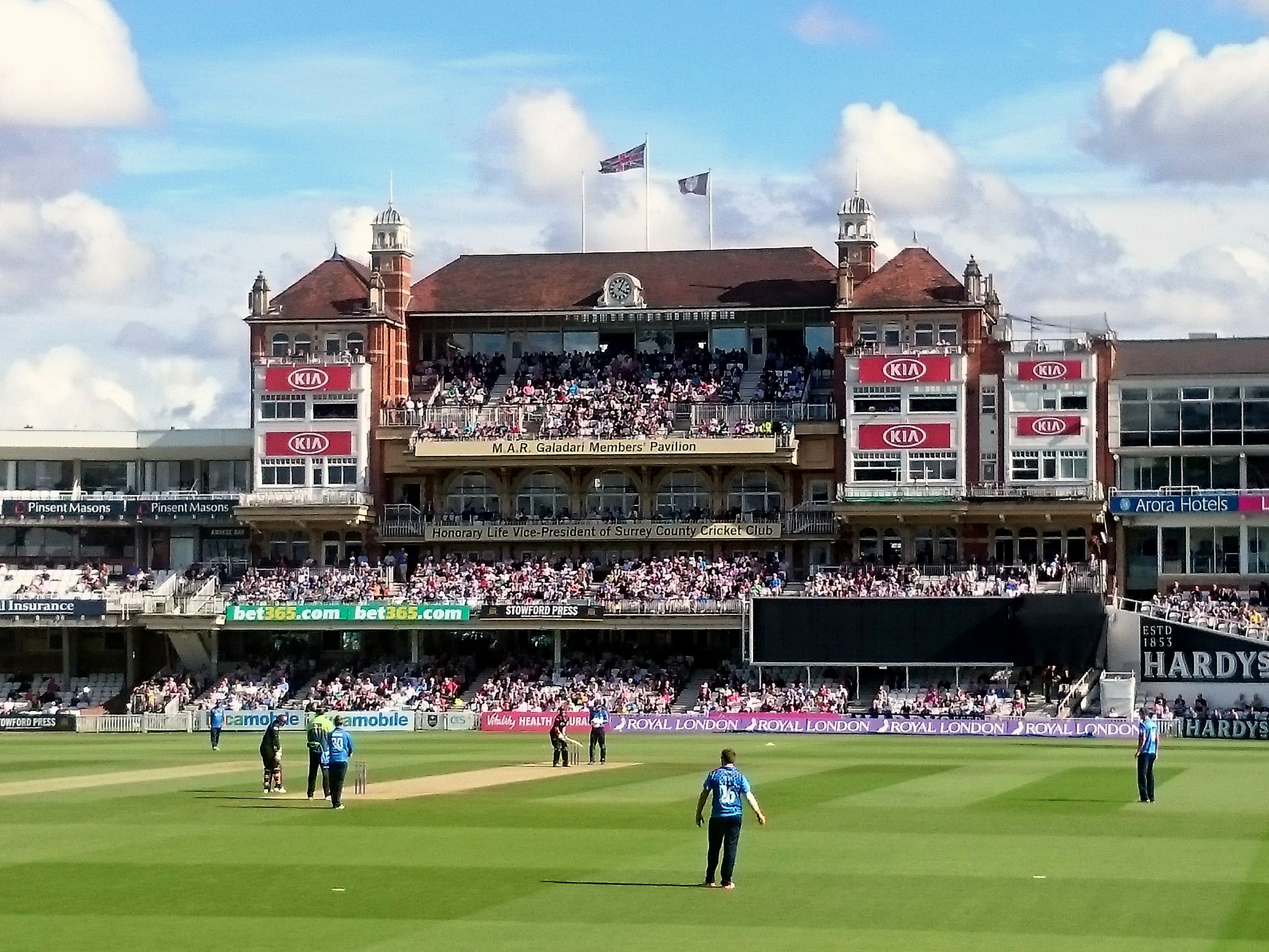
- Left to right; Top: London Eye and Waterloo Station; Upper: Lambeth Bridge and Vauxhall Bridge; Lower: Lambeth Palace and Brixton Town Hall; Bottom: Clapham Common and The Oval

- Coat of arms Council logo
- Motto(s): Spectemur agendo (Let us be judged by our acts)
- Lambeth shown within Greater London
- Sovereign state: United Kingdom
- Constituent country: England
- Region: London
- Ceremonial county: Greater London
- Created: 1 April 1965
- Admin HQ: Brixton Hill, Lambeth Town Hall

Government
  - Type: London borough council
  - Body: Lambeth London Borough Council
  - London Assembly: Marina Ahmad (Labour)
  - MPs: 4 MPs: Florence Eshalomi (L); Helen Hayes (L); Steve Reed (L); Bell Ribeiro-Addy (L)

Area
  - Total: 10.36 sq mi (26.82 km^{2})
  - Rank: 283rd (of 296)

Population (2025)
  - Total: 314,298
  - Rank: 46th (of 296)
  - Density: 30,350/sq mi (11,720/km^{2})
- Time zone: UTC (GMT)
  - Summer (DST): UTC+1 (BST)
- Postcodes: SE, SW
- Area code: 020
- ISO 3166 code: GB-LBH
- ONS code: 00AY
- GSS code: E09000022
- Police: Metropolitan Police
- Website: www.lambeth.gov.uk

Lambeth (/ˈlæmbəθ/) is a London borough in South London, England, which forms part of Inner London. Its name was recorded in 1062 as Lambehitha ("landing place for lambs") and in 1255 as Lambeth. The geographical centre of London is at Frazier Street near Lambeth North tube station, though nearby Charing Cross on the other side of the Thames in the City of Westminster is traditionally considered the centre of London.

== History ==
The area of the modern borough had historically been part of the county of Surrey, and generally corresponds to the three ancient parishes of Lambeth, Clapham and Streatham.

The parish of Lambeth included the archiepiscopal Lambeth Palace, and formed part of the Hundred of Brixton. It was an elongated north–south parish with two miles (three kilometres) of River Thames frontage opposite the City of London and the City and Liberty of Westminster. Lambeth became part of the Metropolitan Police District in 1829.

From 1856 the area of the modern borough was governed by the Metropolitan Board of Works, which was established to provide services across the metropolis of London. In 1889 the Metropolitan Board of Works' area was made the County of London. From 1856 until 1900 the lower tier of local government within the metropolis comprised various parish vestries and district boards; the parish of Lambeth was governed by its vestry, whilst Clapham and Streatham were both included in the Wandsworth District. In 1900 the lower tier was reorganised into metropolitan boroughs. The parish of Lambeth became the Metropolitan Borough of Lambeth, and the old Wandsworth District became the Metropolitan Borough of Wandsworth.

The modern London borough was created in 1965 under the London Government Act 1963. It was a merger of the old borough of Lambeth and the Clapham and Streatham areas from the old Wandsworth borough.

When the government was drafting the boundaries for the London boroughs in the early 1960s, it initially suggested that the Metropolitan Borough of Lambeth and the Metropolitan Borough of Southwark be merged into a new borough; the southern and eastern sections of the Metropolitan Borough of Wandsworth (including Clapham, Streatham and Tooting) would form another. South Shields town clerk R.S. Young was commissioned to make final recommendations to the government on the shape of the future London boroughs, and he noted that the Wandsworth council opposed the partition of its borough. However, Wandsworth's suggestion to merge Lambeth with the Metropolitan Borough of Battersea was rejected by both councils involved. Young believed that residents of Clapham and Streatham would be more familiar with Brixton than with Wandsworth, and recommended a new borough formed from the Metropolitan Borough of Lambeth and six wards and portions of two others from the Metropolitan Borough of Wandsworth.

In the 2016 European Union referendum, Lambeth had the highest share of Remain votes in the United Kingdom at 78.62%, second to overseas territory Gibraltar's 95.9%.

== Geography ==
Lambeth is a long, thin borough, about three miles (five kilometres) wide and seven miles (eleven kilometres) long. Brixton is its civic centre, and there are other town centres. The largest shopping areas are (in order of size) Streatham, Brixton, Vauxhall, Clapham and West Norwood.

In the northern part of the borough are the central London districts of the South Bank, Vauxhall and Lambeth; in the south are the suburbs of Gipsy Hill, Streatham, West Dulwich and West Norwood. In between are the developed and inner-city districts of Brixton, Brixton Hill, Streatham Hill, Clapham, Clapham Park, Herne Hill, Stockwell, Tulse Hill and Kennington, each at different stages of gentrification with suburban and urban elements. Vauxhall and South Lambeth are central districts in the process of redevelopment with high-density business and residential property. Streatham lies between suburban London and inner-city Brixton, with the suburban and developed areas of Streatham, Streatham Hill and Streatham Vale.

The London Borough of Southwark lies to the east of the Borough of Lambeth. To the west is the London Borough of Wandsworth; to the south-west is the London Borough of Merton; and to the south is the London Borough of Croydon and the London Borough of Bromley.

=== Parks and green space ===
Lambeth's open spaces include Brockwell Park and Brockwell Lido, Streatham Common, half of Clapham Common, West Norwood Cemetery, Archbishop's Park, Vauxhall Pleasure Gardens and Ruskin Park, Larkhall Park and Kennington Park.

=== Landmarks ===
Along and around the South Bank, a tourist area has developed around the former Greater London Council headquarters of County Hall and the Southbank Centre and National Theatre. Also on the river is the London Eye and Shell Centre. Nearby is St Thomas' Hospital, Lambeth Palace and the Florence Nightingale Museum. Nearby is Brixton, home of Lambeth Town Hall and the Brixton Murals and MI6 headquarters.

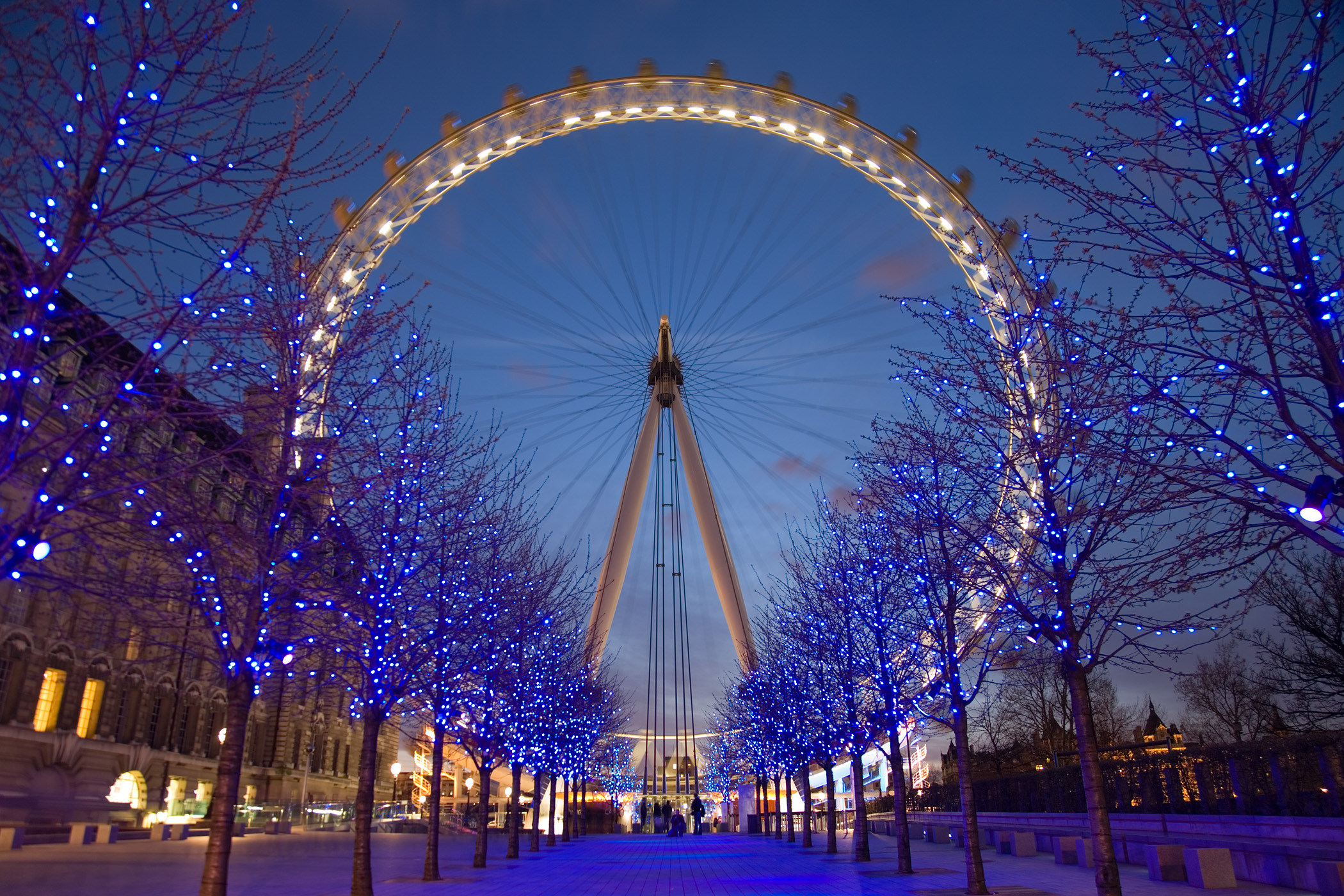
The London Eye

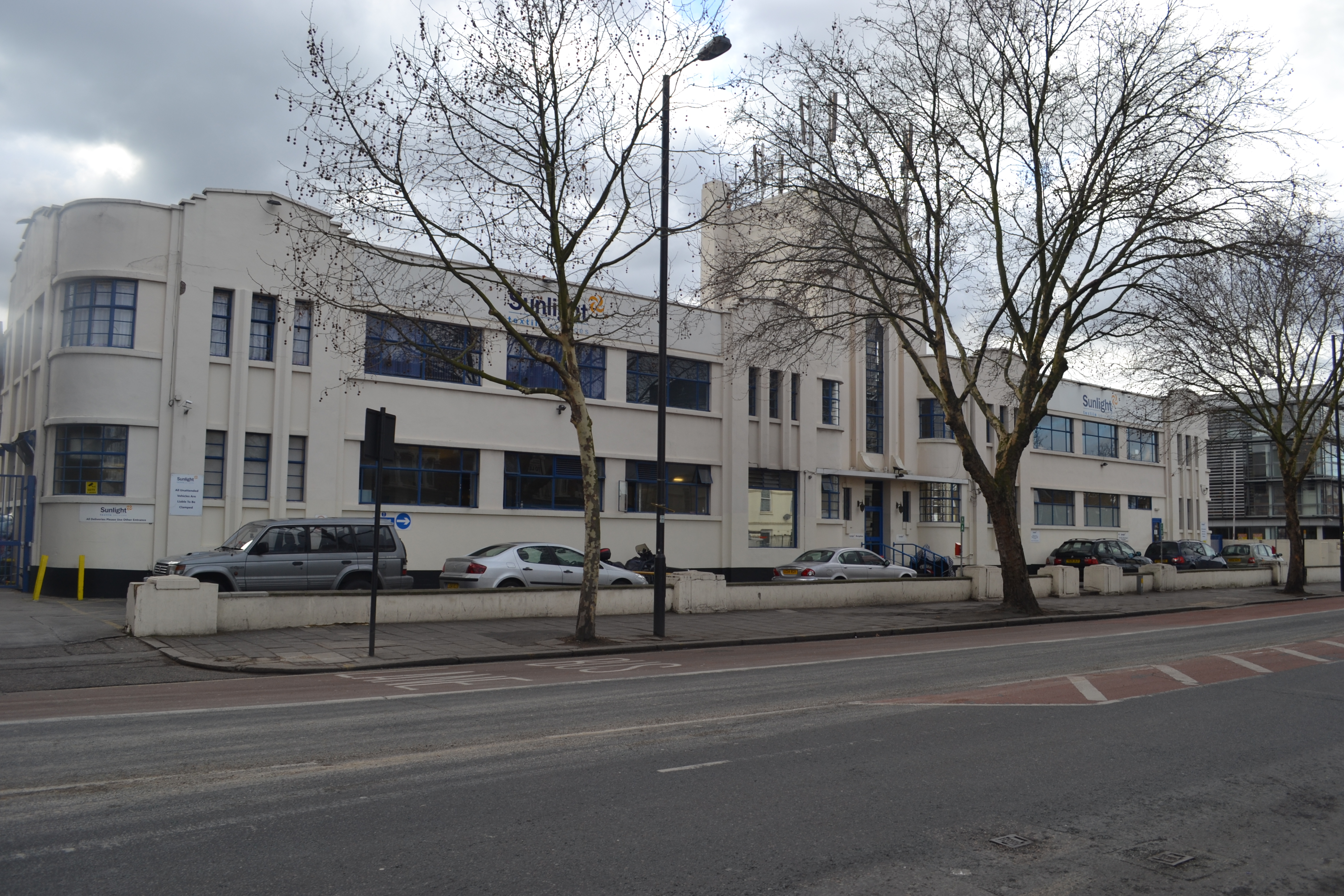
Sunlight Laundry, Brixton

Landmark church buildings include:

- St Mary's, Lambeth (now the Garden Museum)
- The four "Waterloo Churches" in the former Lambeth Parish:
  - St Matthew's, Brixton
  - St Mark's, Kennington
  - St Luke's, West Norwood
  - St John's, Waterloo
- Holy Trinity, Clapham
- St Leonard's, Streatham
- Christ Church, Streatham Hill
- Christ Church (Church of England), Brixton Road, North Brixton
- All Saints' Church, West Dulwich (Church of England)
- Holy Trinity, Trinity Rise, Tulse Hill
- St John the Divine (Church of England), Vassall Road

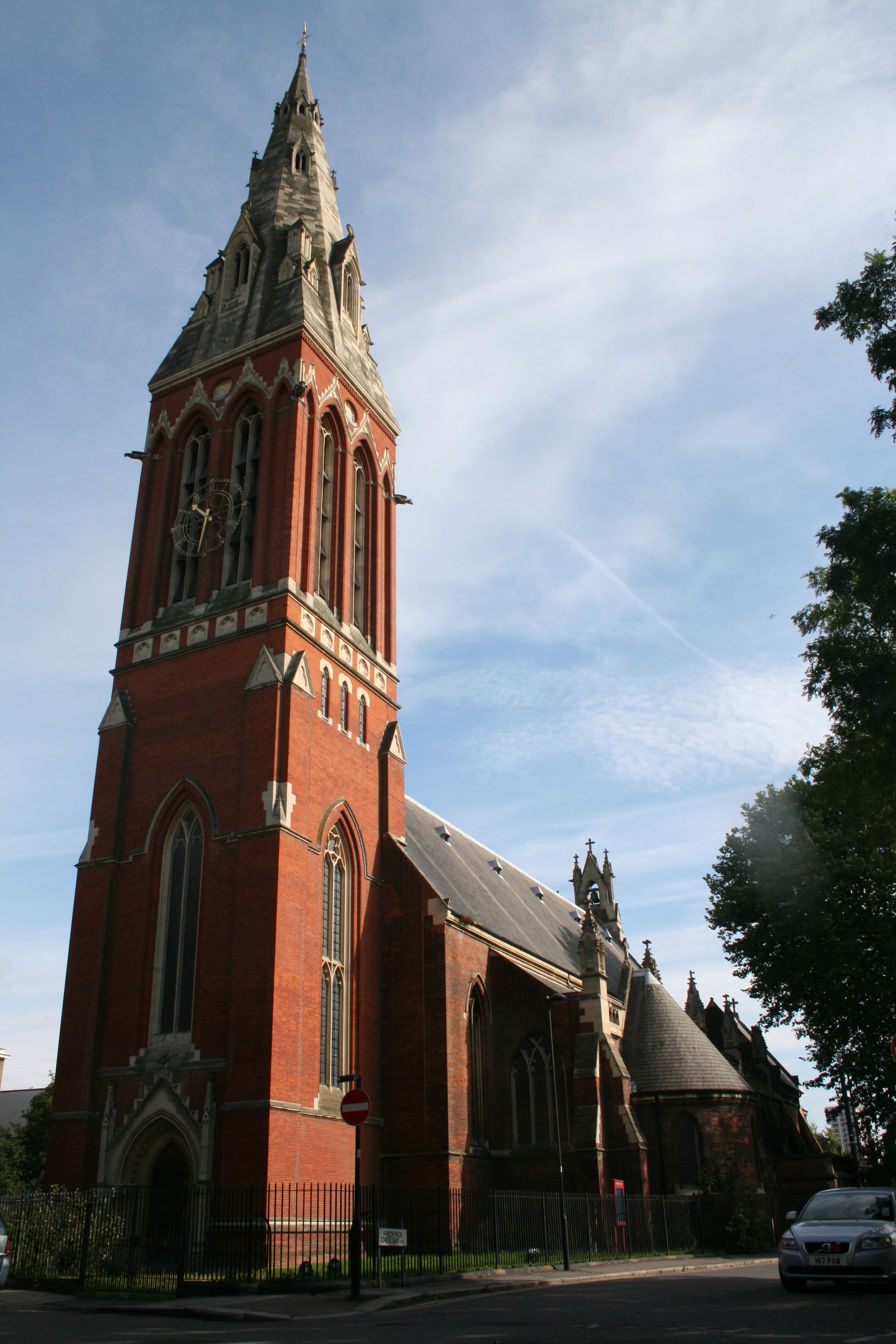
St John the Divine on Vassall Road

The Oval cricket ground in Kennington is the home of Surrey County Cricket Club.

The Basaveshwara statue at the Albert Embankment erected by the former Mayor of Lambeth Neeraj Patil was unveiled by the Prime Minister of India on 14 November 2015.

=== Geology ===
The bedrock of the London Borough of Lambeth is London Clay Formation, clay and silt formed in the Palaeogene period between 56 and 47.8 million years ago (mya) with one small arc of Lambeth Group clay, silt and sand (at the base of the London Clay Formation) of the same period, leading from the southeast of Brockwell Park and under Croxted Road, formed between 59.2 and 47.8 mya.

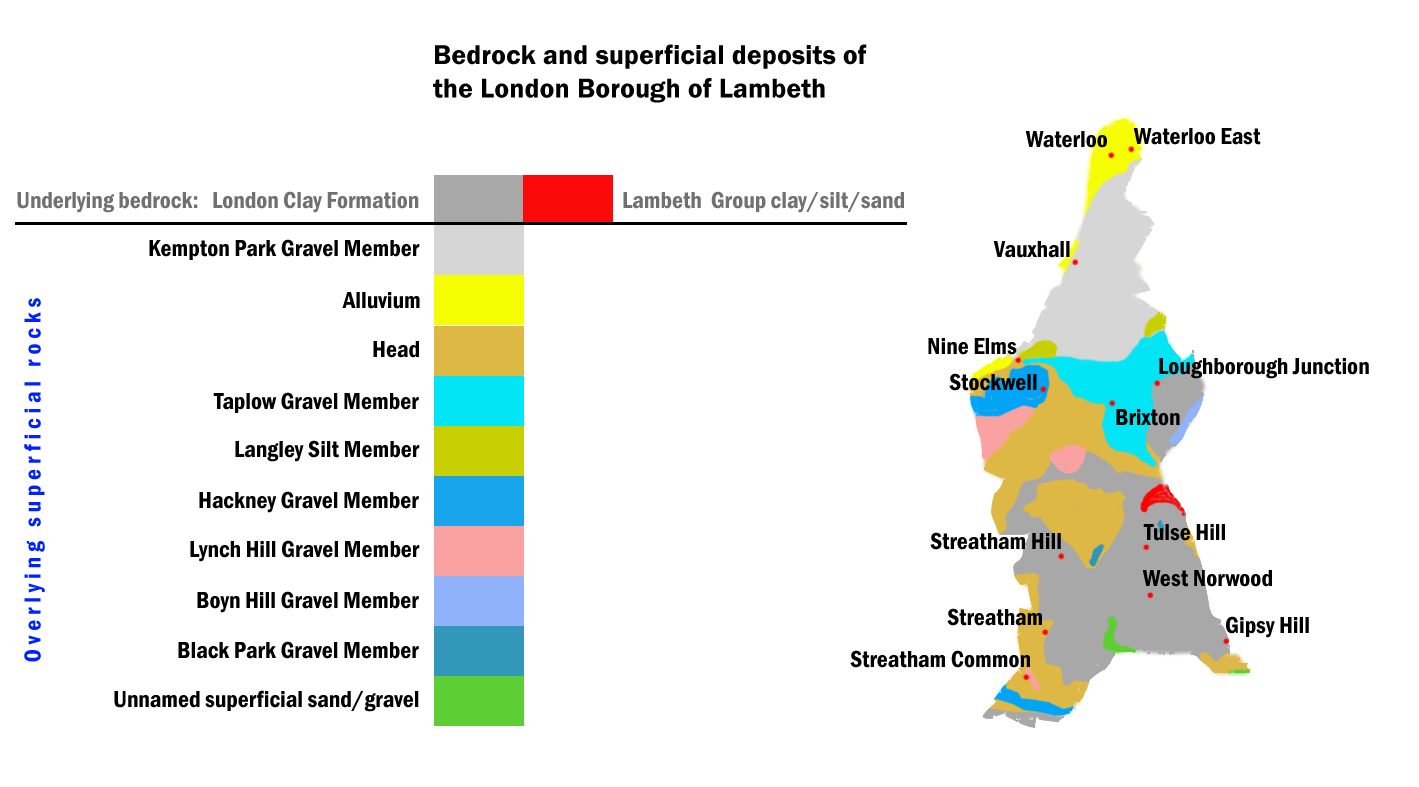
Map showing the bedrock and overlying superficial deposits in Lambeth.

There are a number of members of overlying superficial rocks from the Quaternary period. Close to the Thames, around Waterloo Station for example, the rock is estuarine alluvium made of clay, silt, sand and peat formed from 11.8 thousand years ago (tya) to the present. South of that is a Kempton Park Gravel member, formed between 116 and 11.8 tya which extends south past Stockwell station approximately to Jeffrey's Road, with small areas of Langley Silt of the same age in the east and west. In the east, along Herne Hill and Denmark Hill is a Boyn Hill Gravel member, deposited between 423 and 126 tya. Further south are areas of Head (poorly sorted clay, silt, sand and gravel laid up to 2.588 mya associated with slow-moving, waterlogged soil) e.g. from Clapham North station to Atkins Road and Streatham Hill, Lynch Hill Gravel (sand and gravel, 326 to 126 tya) under most of Clapham Common, Hackney Gravel (sand and gravel, 326 to 126 tya) west of Clapham North station, Black Park Gravel (sand and gravel, 480 to 423 tya) making up the high parts of Streatham Hill and Knights Hill and Taplow Gravel (sand and gravel, 362 to 126 tya) under Brixton, the southern part of Stockwell Road and up to Camberwell New Road. In the very southeast and southwest is more Head, along with Hackney Gravel under Streatham Vale. In the south and southeast around Leigham Court Road, Crown Lane, Central Hill and Westow Hill are unnamed sand and gravel deposits.

Elevations in Lambeth range from 0 metres at the intertidal area of the Thames, 3 to 4 metres in flat, built-on areas at the river bank up to 111 metres in the southeast by the junction of Westow Hill and Crystal Palace Parade.

== Governance ==
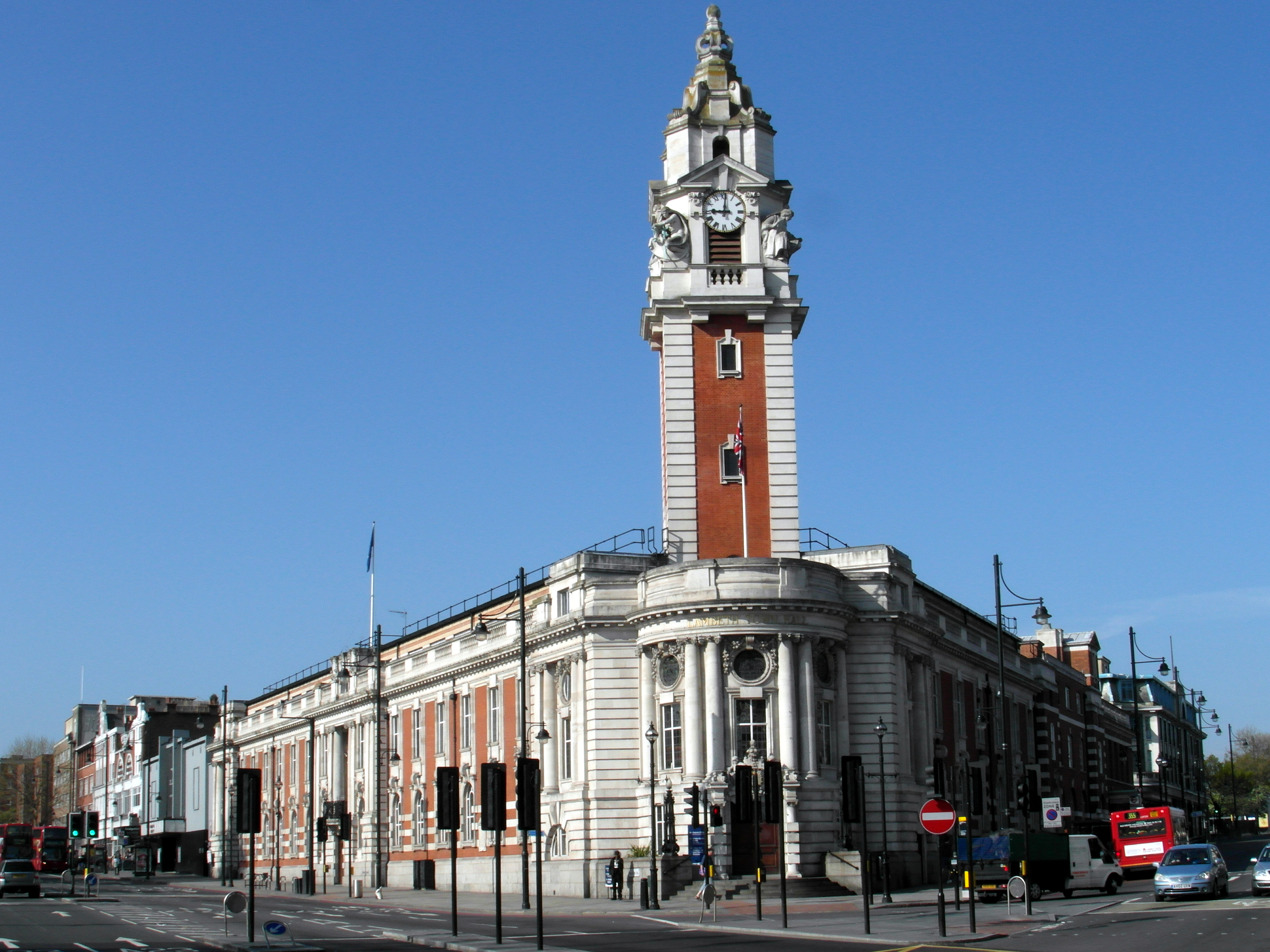
Lambeth Town Hall, completed in 1908

The local authority is Lambeth Council, which meets at Lambeth Town Hall in the Brixton area of the borough and has its main offices at the nearby civic centre.

=== Greater London representation ===
Since 2000, for elections to the London Assembly, the borough forms part of the Lambeth and Southwark constituency.

=== Westminster Parliament ===
The borough has four Parliamentary constituencies: Dulwich and West Norwood (shared with Southwark), Clapham and Brixton Hill, Streatham and Croydon South (shared with Croydon) and Vauxhall and Camberwell Green (also shared with Southwark).

== Demography ==
Lambeth population pyramid in 2021

Population census
Year	Pop.	±%
1801	34,135	—
1811	49,511	+45.0%
1821	68,458	+38.3%
1831	102,524	+49.8%
1841	131,131	+27.9%
1851	158,559	+20.9%
1861	204,252	+28.8%
1871	249,945	+22.4%
1881	295,637	+18.3%
1891	332,619	+12.5%
1901	357,316	+7.4%
1911	383,848	+7.4%
1921	388,779	+1.3%
1931	393,782	+1.3%
1941	355,970	−9.6%
1951	321,795	−9.6%
1961	315,184	−2.1%
1971	308,740	−2.0%
1981	244,153	−20.9%
1991	256,406	+5.0%
2001	266,170	+3.8%
2011	303,086	+13.9%
2021	317,650	+4.8%
2024 estimate	316,920	−0.2%
Note: 2024 estimate

=== Ethnicity ===
Ethnic makeup of Lambeth by single year ages in 2021

Initial migration from the West Indies accounted for a significant part of the population since the mid 1950s onwards. In 1955, there was around an estimated 3,500 Afro-Caribbeans in Lambeth. By 1963, this had risen to around 10,000 Afro-Caribbeans.

Ethnic Group	Year													
Ethnic Group	1966 estimations		1971 estimations		1981 estimations		1991 census		2001 census		2011 census		2021 census	
Ethnic Group	Number	%	Number	%	Number	%	Number	%	Number	%	Number	%	Number	%
White: Total	–	93.3%	–	86.2%	189,718	76.3%	178,168	69.4%	166,058	62.39%	173,025	57.09%	174,778	55%
White British	–	–	–	–	–	–	–	–	131,939	49.57%	118,250	39.02%	119,395	37.6%
White Irish	–	–	–	–	–	–	–	–	8,689	3.26%	7,456	2.46%	6,828	2.1%
White Gypsy or Irish Traveller	–	–	–	–	–	–	–	–	–	–	195	0.06%	146	0.0%
White: Roma	–	–	–	–	–	–	–	–	–	–	–	–	1,537	0.5%
Other White	–	–	–	–	–	–	–	–	25,430	9.55%	47,124	15.55%	46,872	14.8%
Asian or Asian British: Total	–	–	–	–	10,663	4.3%	15,609	6.1%	15,526	5.83%	20,938	6.91%	23,051	7.3%
British Indians	–	–	–	–	4,328	1.7%	5,500	2.1%	5,316	2.00%	4,983	1.64%	6,054	1.9%
British Pakistanis	–	–	–	–	1,632	0.6%	2,120	0.8%	2,634	0.99%	3,072	1.01%	3,868	1.2%
British Bangladeshis	–	–	–	–	917	0.4%	1,646	0.6%	2,169	0.81%	2,221	0.73%	2,502	0.8%
British Chinese	–	–	–	–	2,104	0.8%	3,224	1.3%	3,362	1.26%	4,573	1.51%	4,986	1.6%
Other Asian	–	–	–	–	1,682	0.7%	3,119	1.2%	2,045	0.77%	6,089	2.01%	5,641	1.8%
Black or Black British: Total	–	–	–	–	43,978	17.7%	56,793	22.1%	68,554	25.76%	78,542	25.91%	76,145	24%
African	–	–	–	–	10,883	4.4%	17,018	6.6%	30,836	11.59%	35,187	11.61%	37,359	11.8%
Caribbean	–	5.2%	–	–	27,564	11.1%	32,702	12.7%	32,139	12.07%	28,886	9.53%	28,991	9.1%
Other Black	–	–	–	–	5,531	2.2%	7,073	2.7%	5,579	2.10%	14,469	4.77%	9,795	3.1%
Mixed or British Mixed: Total	–	–	–	–	–	–	–	–	12,854	4.83%	23,160	7.64%	25,630	8%
Mixed: White and Black Caribbean	–	–	–	–	–	–	–	–	5,322	2.00%	8,302	2.74%	8,348	2.6%
Mixed: White and Black African	–	–	–	–	–	–	–	–	2,159	0.81%	4,301	1.42%	4,006	1.3%
Mixed: White and Asian	–	–	–	–	–	–	–	–	2,100	0.79%	3,574	1.18%	4,541	1.4%
Mixed: Other Mixed	–	–	–	–	–	–	–	–	3,273	1.23%	6,983	2.30%	8,735	2.7%
Other: Total	–	–	–	–	4,331	1.7%	6,031	2.4%	3,177	1.19%	7,421	2.45%	18,046	5.6%
Other: Arab	–	–	–	–	–	–	–	–	–	–	1,728	0.57%	2,649	0.8%
Other: Any other ethnic group	–	–	–	–	–	–	–	–	3,177	1.19%	5,693	1.88%	15,397	4.8%
Ethnic minority: Total	–	6.7%	–	13.8%	58,972	23.7%	78,433	30.6%	100,111	37.61%	130,061	42.91%	142,872	45%
Total	–	100%	–	100%	248,690	100%	256,601	100%	266,169	100.00%	303,086	100.00%	317,650	100%

Ethnic Group	Ethnicity of Pupils in Lambeth		
Ethnic Group	2000	2014	2023
Ethnic Group	%	%	%
White: Total	38.6%	29.3%	30.7%
White: British	24.9%	13.7%	15.3%
White: Irish	1.4%	0.4%	0.4%
White: Portuguese	4.4%	5.9%	3%
White: Turkish	0.6%	0.4%	0.3%
White: Greek	0.3%	0.2%	0.1%
White: Other	7%	8.7%	11.6%
Asian or Asian British: Total	6.7%	5.7%	6.2%
Asian or Asian British: Indian	1.6%	0.7%	0.9%
Asian or Asian British: Pakistani	1.2%	1.2%	1.5%
Asian or Asian British: Bangladeshi	1.9%	1.5%	1.3%
Asian or Asian British: Chinese	1.1%	0.8%	0.5%
Asian or Asian British: Vietnamese	0.9%	0.2%	0.2%
Asian or Asian British: Other Asian	–	1.3%	1.8%
Black or Black British: Total	54.8%	44.7%	38.4%
Black or Black British: African	21.2%	24.2%	21.7%
Black or Black British: Caribbean	22.6%	16%	12.4%
Black or Black British: Other Black	11%	4.5%	4.3%
Mixed or British Mixed: Total	–	12.9%	15.7%
Mixed: White and Black Caribbean	–	4.6%	4.5%
Mixed: White and Black African	–	2%	2.2%
Mixed: White and Asian	–	0.9%	1.5%
Mixed: Other Mixed	–	5.4%	7.5%
Other: Total	–	4.6%	5.9%
Ethnic minority: Total	61.4%	70.7%	69.3%
Total	100%	100%	100%

=== Language ===
Main languages spoken by all Lambeth pupils (%)
Language	1992	2014	2023
English	76.0%	49.6%	51.8%
Portuguese	1.5%	7.6%	6%
Spanish	0.9%	5.1%	7.1%
Somali	0.1%	4.5%	3.8%
French	1.0%	3.7%	3.1%
Yoruba	3.2%	3.4%	2.1%
Akan/TwiFante	1.5%	2.7%	2.1%
Polish	0.1%	2.6%	2.8%
Arabic	1.2%	2.5%	3.1%
Bengali	1.9%	1.6%	1.2%

=== Religion ===
Religion	2011		2021	
Religion	Number	%	Number	%
Christian	160,944	53.1	138,714	43.7
Buddhist	2,963	1.0	2,437	0.8
Hindu	3,119	1.0	3,179	1.0
Jewish	1,134	0.4	1,344	0.4
Muslim	21,500	7.1	25,871	8.1
Sikh	440	0.1	527	0.2
Other religion	1,682	0.6	2,351	0.7
No religion	84,803	28.0	119,123	37.5
Religion not stated	26,501	8.7%	24,110	7.6
Total	303,086	100.00	317,600	100.0

=== Sexuality ===
Lambeth is the local authority with the highest relative gay or lesbian population in the UK, at 5.5%, with the borough containing the gay village of Vauxhall and the area around Clapham Common.

=== Immigration ===
This list includes top-15 sources of immigration to Borough of Lambeth for 2021 census:

#	Country	Number
1	Jamaica	7,842
2	Portugal	7,012
3	Italy	5,675
4	Poland	5,139
5	Nigeria	4,817
6	Spain	4,344
7	Ireland	4,230
8	Ghana	4,106
9	France	3,828
10	Brazil	3,521
11	Colombia	3,360
12	United States	3,061
13	Australia	2,966
14	Ecuador	2,914
15	Somalia	2,511

== Arts ==
- South London Theatre, a community theatre in West Norwood
- National Theatre
- Southbank Centre
- Old Vic Theatre
- Young Vic Theatre
- Ballet Rambert
- British Film Institute
- Black Cultural Archives
- Gasworks Gallery
- Newport Street Gallery
- Ovalhouse theatre
- Cinema Museum
- National Film Theatre

== Transport ==
The borough covers London Waterloo railway station, the Waterloo tube station network and (until 2007) the London terminus for Eurostar. National Rail service in Lambeth is provided by South Western Railway, Southeastern, Southern, Thameslink and London Overground.

=== Bridges and tunnels ===
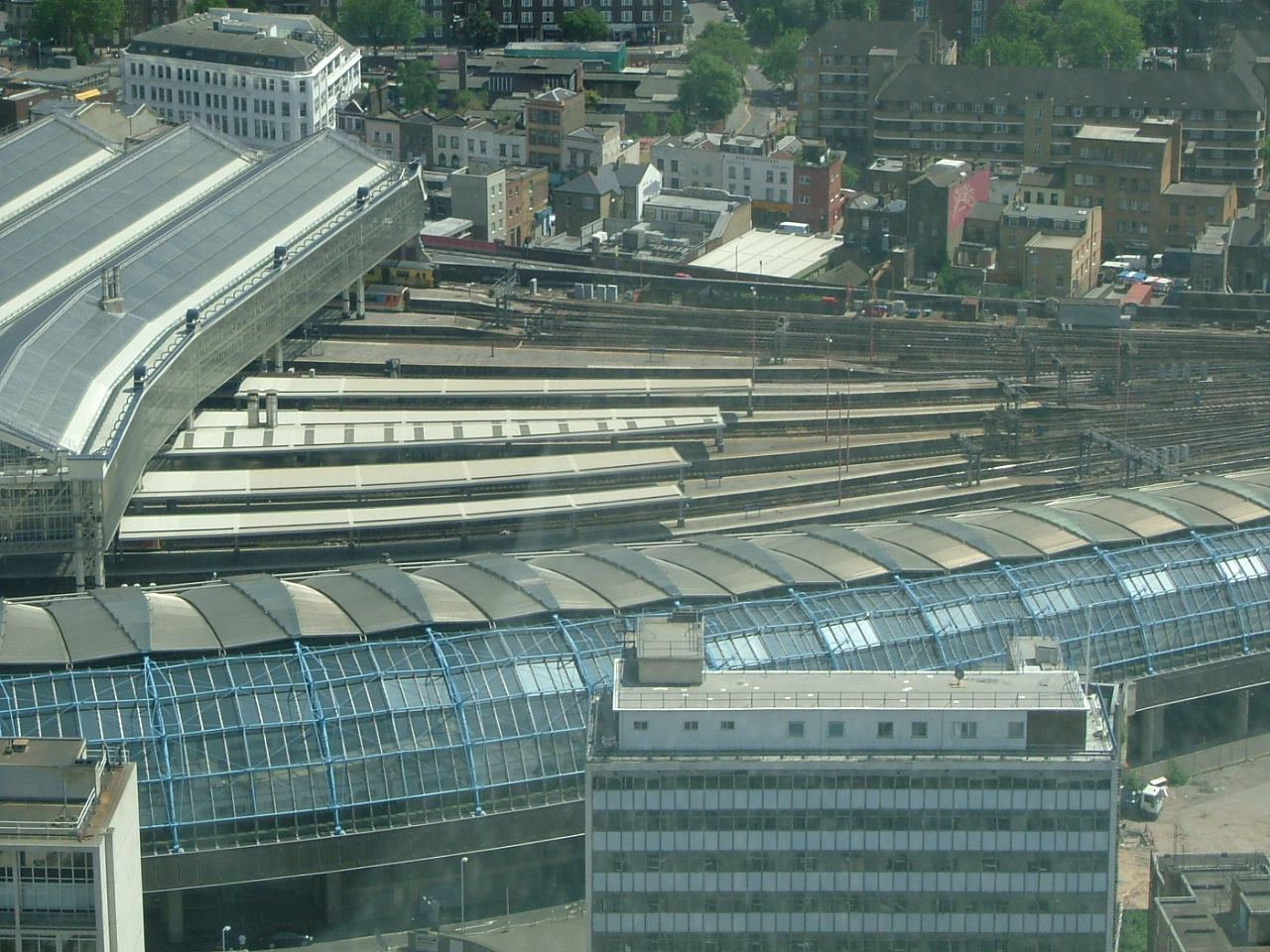
Waterloo Station from the London Eye

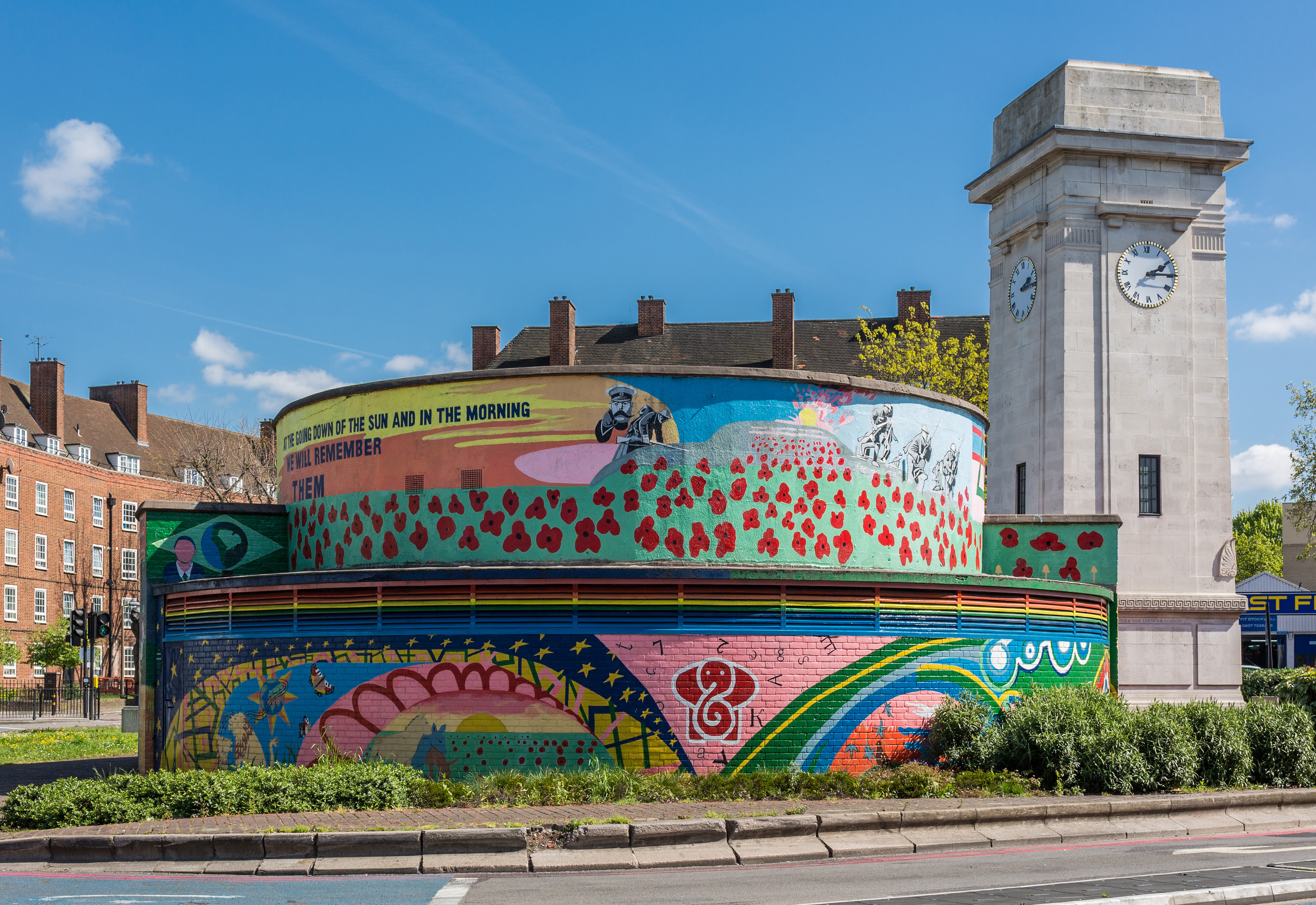
Stockwell War Memorial and shelter

- Waterloo Bridge,
- Hungerford Bridge and Golden Jubilee Bridges
- Lambeth Bridge
- Westminster Bridge
- Vauxhall Bridge
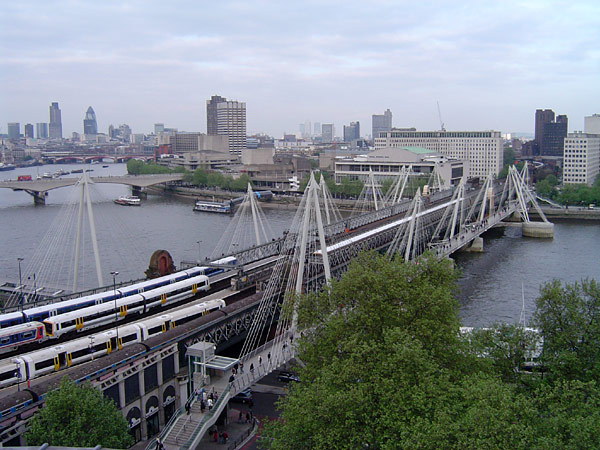
  Hungerford and Golden Jubilee Bridges, seen from the north

=== Railway stations ===
- Brixton railway station
- Gipsy Hill railway station
- Herne Hill railway station
- Loughborough Junction railway station
- Streatham railway station
- Streatham Common railway station
- Streatham Hill railway station
- Tulse Hill railway station
- Vauxhall railway station
- London Waterloo railway station
- Waterloo East railway station
- West Norwood railway station

=== London Overground stations ===
- Clapham High Street railway station
- Wandsworth Road railway station

=== Tube stations ===
- Brixton tube station
- Clapham Common tube station
- Clapham North tube station
- Lambeth North tube station
- Nine Elms tube station
- Oval tube station
- Stockwell tube station
- Vauxhall tube station
- Waterloo tube station

=== Commuting ===
In March 2011, the primary forms of transport borough residents used to travel to work were the London Underground, metro, light rail or tram (21.4 percent of residents aged 16–74); bus, minibus or coach (10 percent); train (10 percent); automobile (8.6 percent); bicycle (5.7 percent), or walking (5.4 percent). A small percentage (3.2 percent) worked mainly at—or from—home.

== Twinning ==
The borough and its predecessor have been twinned with the Vincennes district of Paris in France since 1955. Lambeth is also twinned with Bluefields, Nicaragua; Brooklyn, New York; and Spanish Town, Jamaica.

== Coat of arms ==
The borough's coat of arms is that of the former Metropolitan Borough of Lambeth, with two gold stars (mullets) in the second and third quarters of the shield indicating the addition of the districts of Clapham and Streatham. Its motto is "Spectemur agendo" ("Let us be judged according to our conduct").

== See also ==
- List of districts in Lambeth
- List of schools in Lambeth
