= Vittoria (1813 Whitehaven ship) =

History

United Kingdom
- Name: Vittoria
- Launched: 1813, Whitehaven
- Captured: 7 August 1822
- Fate: Wrecked 1822 after capture

General characteristics
- Tons burthen: 236, or 242 (bm)
- Armament: 2 × 4–pounder guns

Vittoria was launched at Whitehaven in 1813 as a West Indiaman. Pirates captured and wrecked her in 1822.

== Career ==
Missing pages in an on-line copy of Lloyd's Register (LR) in 1814 mean that Vittoria first appeared in LR in 1815.

Year	Master	Owner	Trade	Source
1815	Twentyman	W.Bowes	Greenock–Jamaica; London–New York	LR
1818	Twentyman; Montgomery	W.Bowes	London–Barbados	LR
1819	Montgomery	J.Grigg; C.Davison	London–Charleston	LR
1820	Montgomery; W.Hearn	C.Davison; Cohen & Co.	London–Charleston	LR

Judah Cohen and his older brother Hymen Cohen were co-partners in Hymen Cohen & Company, in London. They came to be the most extensive slave owners in Jamaica and the British West Indies in general. They also dealt with trade to Jamaica, and from 1820 or so owned Vittoria

Year	Master	Owner	Trade	Source
1821	W.Hearn	Cohen & Co.	London–Jamaica	LR

On 7 August 1822 a pirate vessel captured Vittoria, Hearn, master, as Vittoria was sailing from Jamaica to London. The pirates also captured another vessel, Industry, Cook, master, which had been sailing from Montego Bay to St Thomas. The pirates put Vittoria's crew aboard Industry and let Industry go.

On 10 August Industry encountered HMS Carnation, under Commander Walcott, which took Hearn and some of his men aboard, offering to take them to Jamaica. Instead, Hearn offered himself and his men to help in the search of the pirates. Then, on 13 August, Carnation transferred Hearn and some of his men to Blackett, which accepted them as passengers for Liverpool. (Note: Blackett, Benson, master, was a snow of 242 tons (bm), launched in Newcastle in 1819.)

Reports from Charleston stated that Vittoria sat inside the Colorados for six weeks while the pirates slowly unloaded her cargo of coffee, which was sold in Havana. Some weeks later Lieutenant Geary of HMS Speedwell discovered bills of lading and coffee bags from Vittoria, when Speedwell raided a pirate base. The pirates also removed Nicaragua wood, lignum vitae and lancewood spars.

== Fate ==
The pirates ran Vittoria aground, wrecking her. Hymen Cohen, Judah Cohen, Andrew Cohen, Alexander Hiam Cohen, Judah Hymen Cohen, the owners of Vittoria and her cargo, put the value of their loss at £27,000. Estimates of underwriters' losses ranged between £30,000 and £40,000, including losses on Industry.
