= Hyman Hurwitz =

- Born: 1770; Poznan, Poland
- Died: 1844 (aged 73–74)
- Occupation: Professor of Hebrew
- Organization: University College London

Hyman Hurwitz (1770–1844) was a learned Jew who became first professor of Hebrew at University College, London. He was born in Poznań, Poland in 1770, came to England about 1797 and conducted a private academy for Jews at Highgate, where he established a close friendship with Samuel Taylor Coleridge and corresponded with him. Coleridge once described Hurwitz as "the first Hebrew and Rabbinical Scholar in the Kingdom". In 1828, on Coleridge's recommendation, he was elected professor of the Hebrew language and literature at University College, London. His inaugural lecture was published. He died on 18 July 1844. Hurwitz was buried in the Brady Street Cemetery near Whitechapel in London's East End.

== Works ==
- Vindiciae Hebraicae, being a Defence of the Hebrew Scriptures as a Vehicle of Revealed Religion, in Refutation of J. Bellamy, 1820.
- Hebrew Tales from the Writings of the Hebrew Sages 1826.
- Elements of the Hebrew Language, 1829; 4th edition, 1848.
- The Etymology and Syntax of the Hebrew Language, 1831; a first part on orthography appeared in 1807.
- A Grammar of the Hebrew Language, 2 parts; 2nd edition, enlarged, 1835.

Hurwitz also wrote many Hebrew hymns, odes, elegies, and dirges. A Hebrew dirge, "chaunted in the Great Synagogue, Aldgate, on the day of the Funeral of Princess Charlotte" was published in 1817, with an English translation in verse by Coleridge. The Knell, another Hebrew elegy by Hurwitz on George III of the United Kingdom, appeared in an English translation by W. Smith at Thurso in 1827. Hurwitz's library was sold at auction by Messrs Evans in at least two sales in London in 1846 (on 20 March [and two following days] and 25 March 1846); copies of the catalogues are held at Cambridge University Library (shelfmarks Munby.c.150(5-6)).

== Collections ==
University College London holds several items relating to Hurwitz:

- A manuscript report on the progress of one of Hurwitz's students from 1835;
- 4 manuscript notebooks by Hurwitz entitled 'Elements of ye Hebrew language' from c.1828;
- 'A Grammar of the Hebrew Language' book by Hurwitz with annotations and working notes;
- Correspondence between Hurwitz and Moses Gaster.
