= Knight's Hill, Tulse Hill =

Hill in the London Borough of Lambeth, England

Coordinates: 51.4439°N 0.1°W

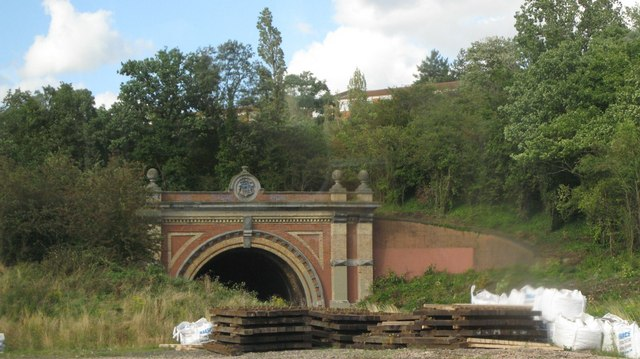
Southern portal of the Knight's Hill Tunnel

Knight's Hill is a hill in the Tulse Hill and West Dulwich area of the London Borough of Lambeth.

== History ==
=== Toponymy ===
Knight's Hill is the northernmost of two hills in Lambeth with the same name. Both have the same origin, referring to the 16th century Knight family who owned land in Lambeth and Streatham. The other hill is located in West Norwood.

=== Governance ===
Knight's Hill was an exclave of the parish of Streatham and a detached portion of the Manor of Leigham Court. The area was amalgamated with the parish of Lambeth in 1901, at which time the population was 3,453. Today, Knight's Hill is in West Dulwich ward in the London Borough of Lambeth.

== Geography ==
The Knight's Hill Tunnel of the railway between North Dulwich and Tulse Hill stations goes through the hill. It was built between 1866 and 1868 by the London, Brighton and South Coast Railway.

It is the location of the Peabody Hill Wood.
