= Brady Street Cemetery =

Cemetery in London

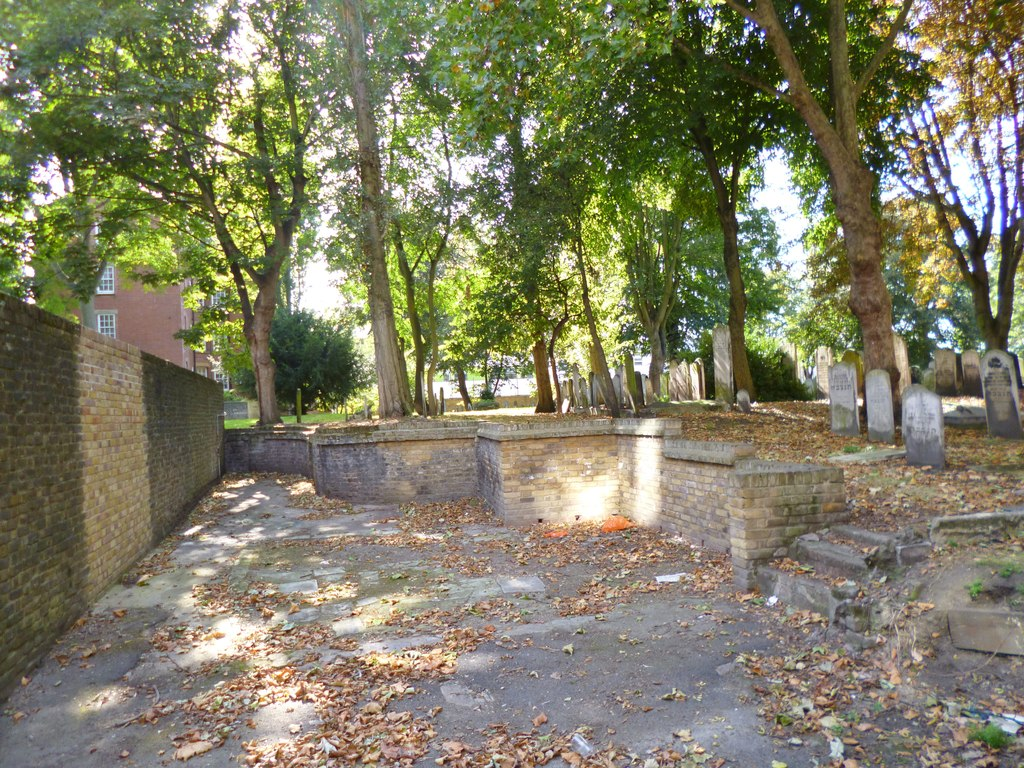
- The cemetery today
- Interactive map of Brady Street Cemetery

Details
- Established: 1761
- Location: Brady Street, Whitechapel, (London Borough of Tower Hamlets), London
- Country: England
- Coordinates: 51°31′19″N 0°03′39″W
- Type: Orthodox Jewish
- Owned by: United Synagogue Burial Society
- Size: 4 acres (1.6 ha)
- Website: Brady Street Cemetery
- Find a Grave: Brady Street Cemetery

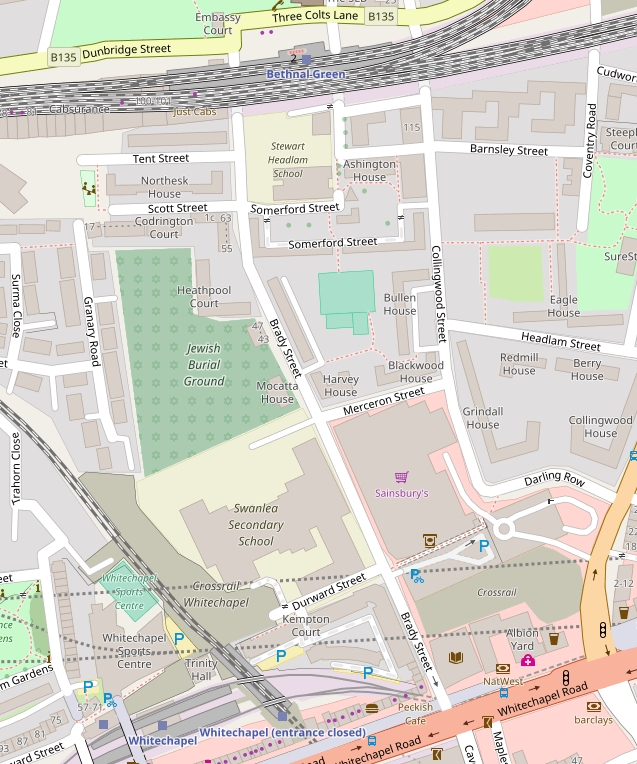
Modern map showing Brady Street including the cemetery, shown as "Jewish burial ground"

The Brady Street Cemetery is a historic Jewish cemetery on Brady Street in Whitechapel, located in the London Borough of Tower Hamlets. The cemetery opened in 1761 as the burial ground for the New Synagogue and was subsequently used by the Great Synagogue. It was closed to further burials from 1857. Several notable people are buried there.

== Architecture ==
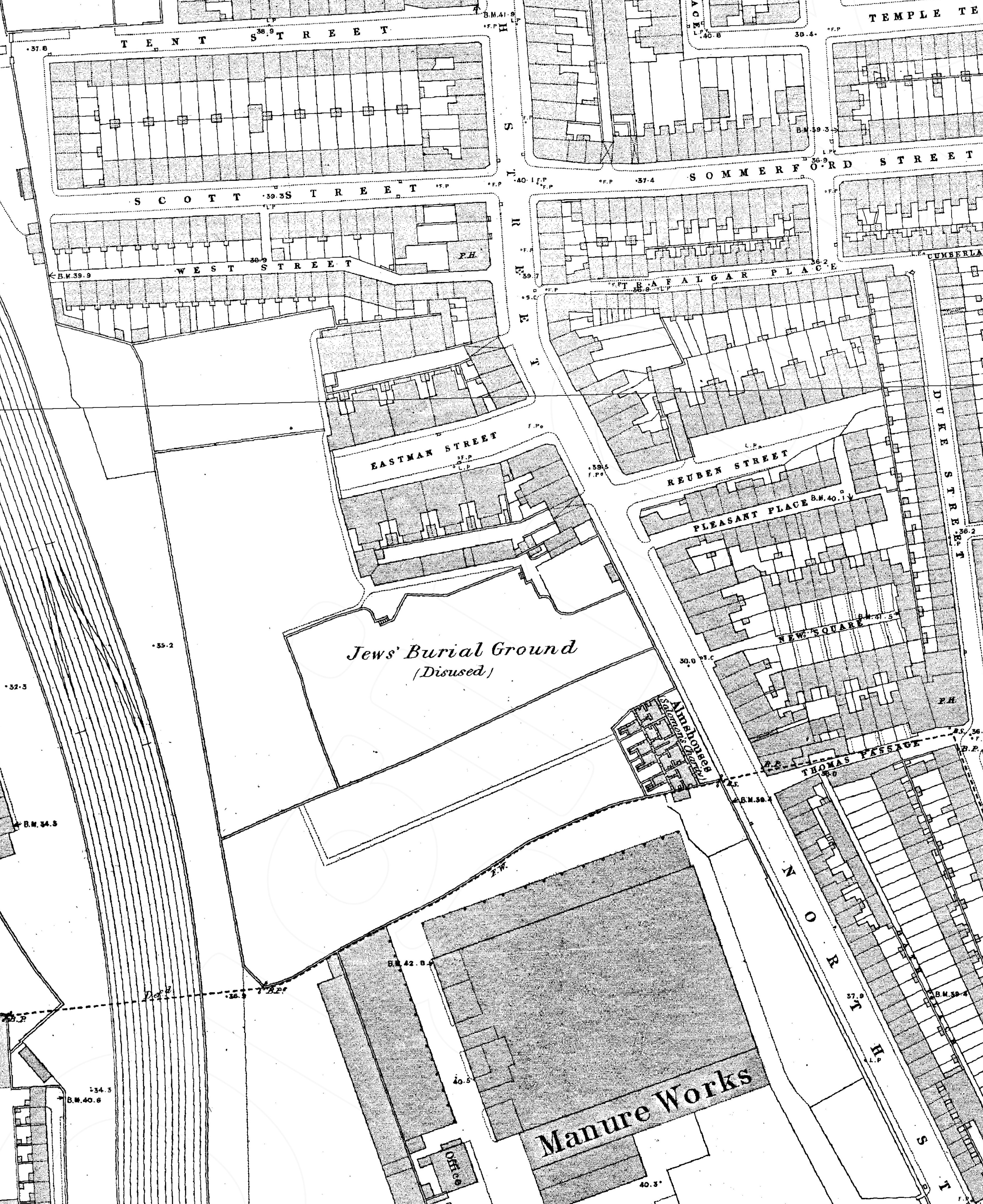
The cemetery marked as the Jews' Burial Ground (Disused) on an 1870s Ordnance Survey map when Brady Street was known as North Street

The cemetery is 4 acres (1.6 ha) in size and is surrounded by a wall topped with broken glass. The London: East edition of the Pevsner Architectural Guides describes the cemetery as "crowded with mainly later Victorian monuments" and highlights Miriam Levy's monument for its "considerable lavishness".

== History ==
The land the cemetery occupies was originally a brickfield on Ducking Pond Lane and was subsequently known as North Street. In 1761 it was leased to the New Synagogue for an annual rent of 12 guineas. The cemetery was extended in 1795.

The Brady Street Cemetery rapidly filled, and a solution was found with the addition of a four-foot layer of soil in the centre of the cemetery to allow additional burials. The raised area became known as the "Strangers Mound" as many of the new burials were not affiliated to any particular congregation. The headstones of the burials in the Strangers Mound and the ones below are set back to back. The Great Synagogue subsequently buried people in the New Synagogue's Jewish cemetery at West Ham after forming a Conjoint Burial Board with the New Synagogue.

In the 1980s the local council intended to redevelop the cemetery with the use of a compulsory purchase order as it had not been used for many years. If a cemetery has not had any interments for 100 years it may be redeveloped, but with the burial of Victor Rothschild, 3rd Baron Rothschild in the cemetery in 1990, the future of the Brady Street Cemetery was secured from building development until at least 2090.

The cemetery is owned by the United Synagogue and open only by appointment.

== Notable burials ==
- Financiers Benjamin (c. 1753–1808) and Abraham (c. 1756–1810) Goldsmid, both of whom committed suicide
- Rabbi of Great Britain Solomon Hirschell (1762–1842)
- Hyman Hurwitz (1770–1844), the first professor of Hebrew at University College, London
- Charity worker Miriam Levy (1801–1850)
- Centenarian Nathan Moses who died aged 107 in 1799
- Banker Nathan Meyer Rothschild (1777–1836) and his wife Hannah Rothschild (née Barent-Cohen, 1783–1850)
- Business executive and intelligence operative Victor Rothschild, 3rd Baron Rothschild (1910–1990)
- Judah Cohen (1768–1838), merchant and owner of numerous slave plantations in Jamaica

== See also ==
- Brady Street
- Jewish cemeteries in the London area
