= Brady Street =

Street in Whitechapel, London

Coordinates: 51.5216°N 0.0595°W

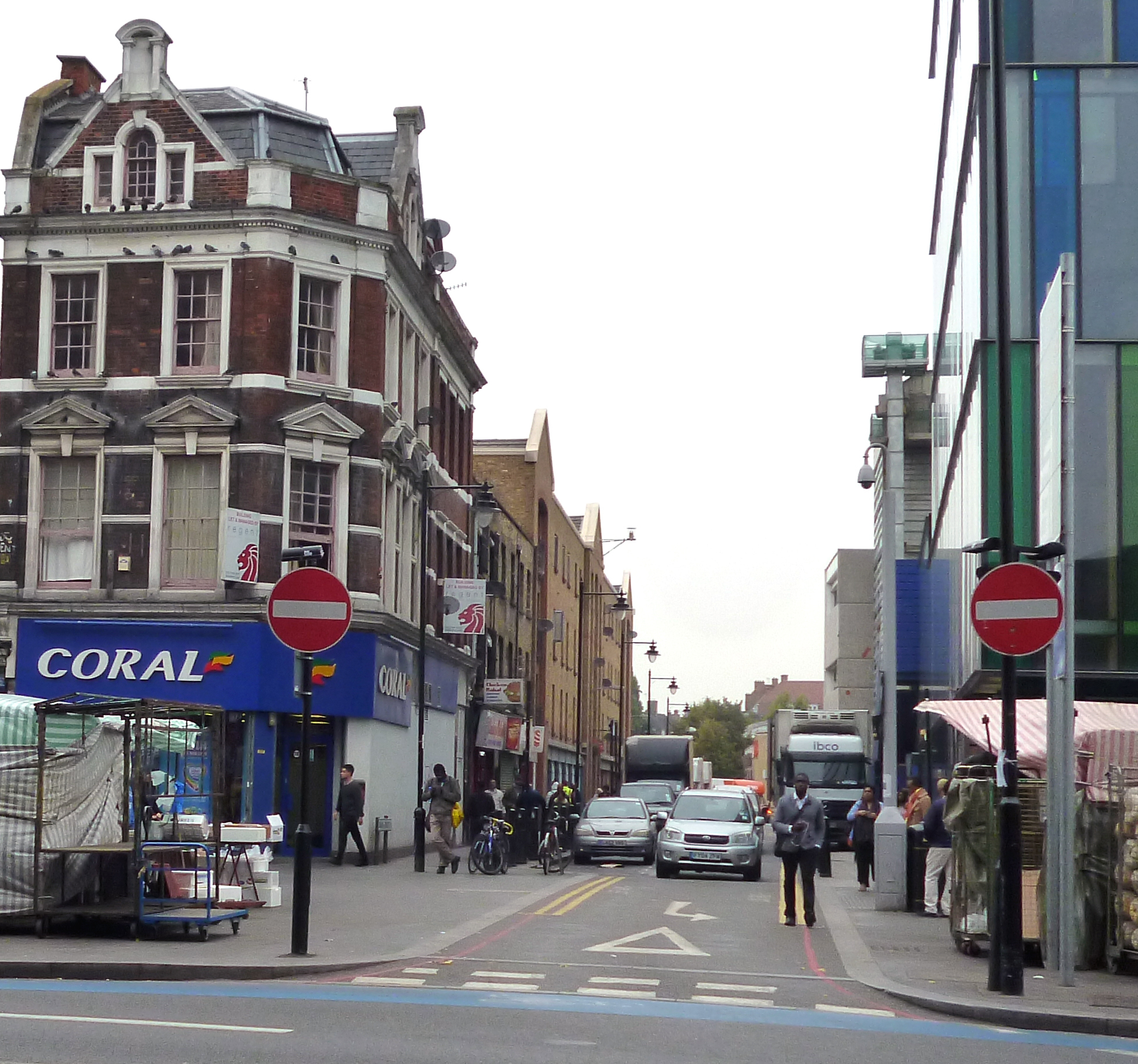
Brady Street, looking north from Whitechapel Road

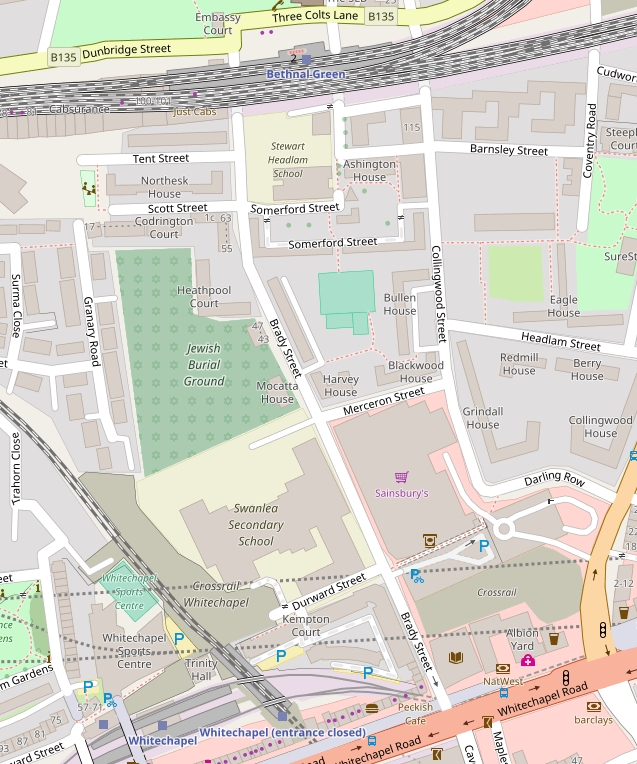
Modern map of Brady Street

Brady Street is a road located in Whitechapel, East London. It runs from Whitechapel Road in the south to Three Colts Lane, near Bethnal Green railway station, in the north. It was formerly known as North Street.

== Buildings ==
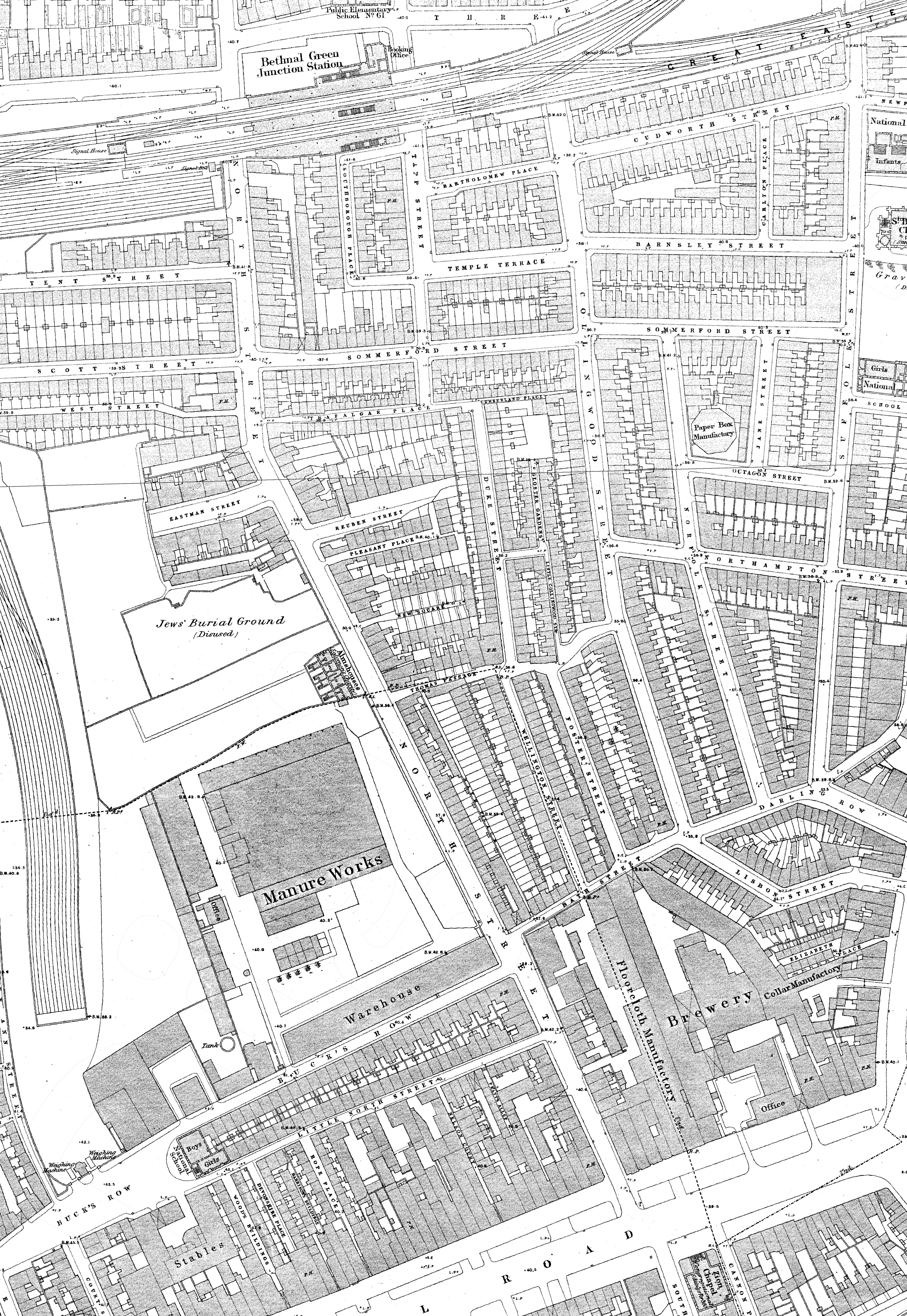
Brady Street on an 1870s Ordnance Survey map when it was still known as North Street.

Until the 1970s the Brady Street Dwellings stood in Brady Street. They were demolished and Swanlea School now stands on the site.

A Sainsbury's supermarket, opened in the 1990s, stands opposite Durward Street.

At the head of the street is the Idea Store, a £12m development opened in 2006. Somerford Street and other roads on the Collingwood Estate are off Brady Street.

The Brady Street Jewish cemetery is located a few hundred yards from Whitechapel Road. The cemetery reached maximum capacity in 1858. One famous occupant is Nathan Mayer Rothschild, one of the founders of the banking dynasty, and once the wealthiest man on earth.

== See also ==
- Brady Street Cemetery
