= Metropolitan Borough of Wandsworth =

Coordinates: 51.4571°N 0.1903°W

Wandsworth
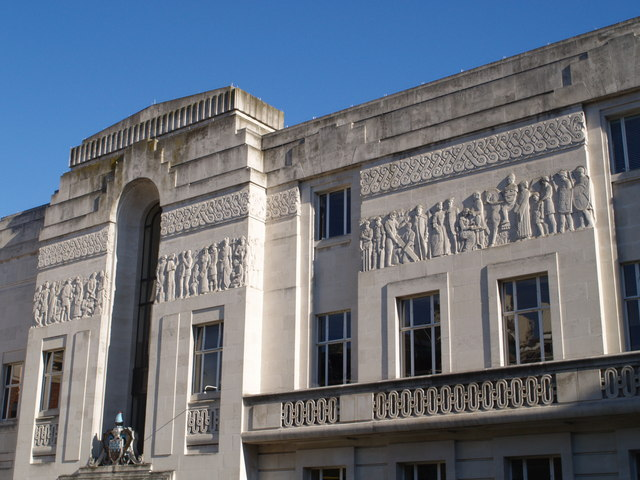
- Wandsworth Town Hall

- Wandsworth within the County of London
- History
  - Origin: Wandsworth District Board of Works
  - Created: 1900
  - Abolished: 1965
  - Succeeded by: London Borough of Wandsworth; London Borough of Lambeth
- Status: Metropolitan borough
- Government: Wandsworth Borough Council
  - HQ: Town Hall, Wandsworth High Street
  - Motto: We Serve
- Coat of arms of the borough council
- Map of borough boundary

The Metropolitan Borough of Wandsworth was a Metropolitan borough under the London County Council, from 1900 to 1965.

== History ==
The borough was formed from five civil parishes: Clapham, Putney, Streatham, Tooting Graveney and Wandsworth. In 1904, these five were combined into a single civil parish called Wandsworth Borough, which was conterminous with the metropolitan borough. Before 1900, these parishes, and Battersea until 1888, had been administered by the Wandsworth District Board of Works.

The borough had an irregular boundary with Mitcham in Surrey. On 1 April 1901 a small unpopulated exclave of Mitcham was transferred to Wandsworth. Part of the boundary followed the River Graveney, which had been culverted. On 1 April 1904 the boundary was straightened.

== Coat of arms ==
The coat of arms were granted on 6 July 1901. The blue wavy division represents the Rivers Wandle and Thames. French Huguenot refugees arrived in the area in 1685, and the blue drops represent the tears of their struggle. The five stars represent the constituent former parishes. At the top is a long boat, with a dragon's head, commemorating 9th century Danish incursions along the river. The borough council's motto was We Serve. The arms can still be seen in the façade of Wandsworth Town Hall.

== Population and area ==
The borough covered 9,130 acres (36.9 km^{2}), which made it the largest in the County of London. The population recorded in the Census was:

Constituent parishes 1801–1899

Year	1801	1811	1821	1831	1841	1851	1861	1871	1881	1891
Population	14,283	17,963	22,726	27,779	33,238	40,204	50,803	71,044	103,172	156,942

Metropolitan Borough 1900–1961

Year	1901	1911	1921	1931	1941	1951	1961
Population	232,024	311,360	328,307	353,110		330,493	347,442

== Politics ==
A map showing the wards of Wandsworth Metropolitan Borough as they appeared in 1916.

The borough was divided into nine wards for elections: Balham, Clapham North, Clapham South, Fairfield, Putney, Southfield, Springfield, Streatham, and Tooting.

=== Parliament constituency ===
For elections to Parliament, the borough was divided into one and a half constituencies:

- Clapham (also including part of the Metropolitan Borough of Battersea)
- Wandsworth

In 1918 the borough's representation was increased to five seats:

- Balham and Tooting
- Clapham
- Putney
- Streatham
- Wandsworth Central

In 1950 the borough's representation was reduced to four seats:

- Clapham
- Putney
- Streatham
- Wandsworth Central

== Replacement ==
When the metropolitan boroughs were replaced with larger London boroughs in 1965, this borough was split. The core area of Wandsworth (about 11 km^{2} or 4.2 sq mi) became part of the London Borough of Wandsworth, along with the former Metropolitan Borough of Battersea, but the areas of Streatham and Clapham (totalling 4 km^{2} or 1.5 sq mi) became part of the London Borough of Lambeth.
