= George Strong (VC) =

Recipient of the Victoria Cross

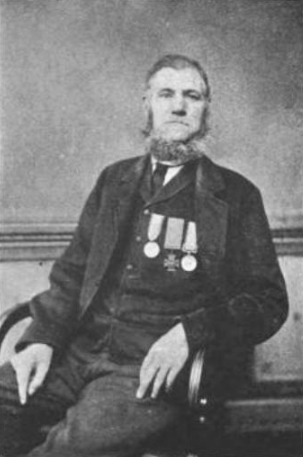
- Born: 7 April 1833; Odcombe, Somerset, England
- Died: 25 August 1888 (aged 55); Sherston Magna, Wiltshire, England
- Burial place: Church of the Holy Cross, Sherston
- Military career
- Allegiance: United Kingdom
- Branch: British Army
- Rank: Private
- Units: Coldstream Guards
- Conflicts: Crimean War
- Awards: Victoria Cross

George Strong VC (7 April 1833 – 25 August 1888) was an English recipient of the Victoria Cross, the highest and most prestigious award for gallantry in the face of the enemy that can be awarded to British and Commonwealth forces.

== Life ==
Strong was born 7 April 1833 in Odcombe, Somerset. He was 19 years old, and a private in the Coldstream Guards, British Army during the Crimean War, when the following deed took place for which he was awarded the VC.

In September 1855, at Sevastopol, in the Crimea, when on duty, Private Strong picked up a live shell which had fallen into the trench, and threw it over the parapet. He was well aware of the extreme danger involved, and his action saved many lives.

After the war, Strong married Eliza Dickenson and they settled in Sherston, Wiltshire. He died on 25 August 1888, aged 52, and was buried in an unmarked grave in the churchyard of Holy Cross, Sherston.

== The medal ==
His Victoria Cross is displayed at The Guards Regimental Headquarters (Coldstream Guards RHQ) in Wellington Barracks, London, England.
