= Whatley Manor =

Hotel in Wiltshire, England

Coordinates: 51.5836°N 2.1495°W

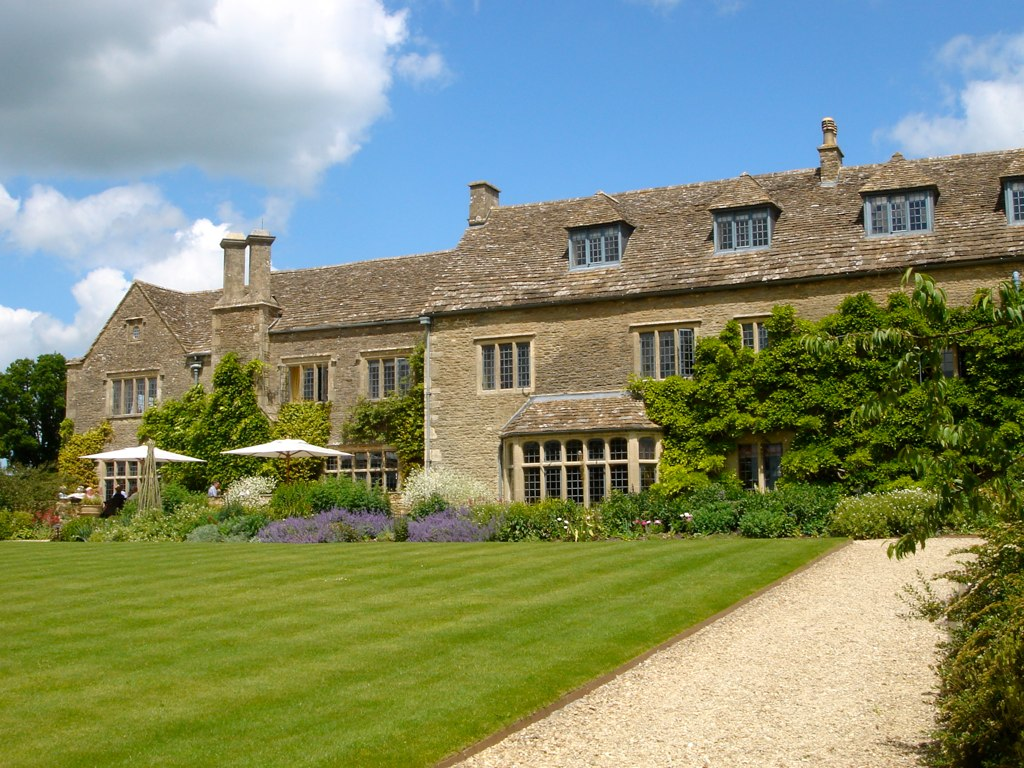
Whatley Manor

Whatley Manor is a hotel, restaurant and spa housed in a former farm and estate buildings, near Easton Grey in the southern Cotswolds, about 2 miles (3.2 km) west of Malmesbury, Wiltshire, England. The main building is a Grade II listed house.

== History ==
Originally named Twatley Manor, an abbreviation of "To the wet lea", the first recorded building is a farmhouse called Twatley Farm which was built in the 18th century and first appears on the Malmesbury Tithe Map in 1840. The farm was bought in 1857 by Mr T G Smith, who from 1871 became the lord of the neighbouring Easton Grey manor. It is believed that during this time the building was enlarged and several outbuildings to the north-west were incorporated or replaced, extending the property.

Ownership of the farm passed to Smith's sister Honora Wilder and her husband Reverend George Wilder, who owned the farm in 1910. Rear admiral Reginald Neeld, his wife Beatrix and daughter lived in the house from 1899 to 1924. During the First World War, the hall at Twatley became a packing station for boxes of leggings, galoshes and Red Cross parcels destined for the Front.

The estate was bought in 1925 from Graham Wilder, Honora and George Wilder's heir, by Herbert Choplin Cox, a Canadian. A Deputy Master of the Beaufort Hunt, he used the estate to hunt and added more land to it. In the 1920s, Cox altered the farmhouse and commissioned architect Septimus Warwick, who in 1925–27 added a Cotswold-style west wing now called the Tudor wing, greatly extended the stable courtyard and built the coach house. Cox imported architectural features from older properties, and laid out ornamental gardens and a small park, as well as constructing the Tower House and buildings which today are part of Twatley Farm.

Cox died in 1945 and his executors sold the estate to Harold Issac Coriat and his wife Priscilla, who owned it until 1957. The house was designated as Grade II listed in 1951. In 1961 the estate was bought and divided by R.J. Rennie. It was around this time that the estate was renamed to Whatley Manor and Twatley Farm became a separate estate and home.

In 1987, Whatley Manor became a hotel. Twatley Manor Farm, with buildings converted from Cox's stables, is in separate ownership.

== Hotel and restaurant ==
Marco and Alix Landolt stayed at Whatley Manor whilst visiting their son, Christian, who was competing at the Badminton Horse Trials. When Whatley Manor came up for sale in 2000 they acquired it and restored it. 12 acres of land have been transformed into 26 distinctive gardens, many of them based on the 1930s plans.

The hotel was refurbished and enlarged in 2001–3 to designs of the David Brain Partnership, retaining its overall 1920s Cotswold style. There is a restaurant for non-residents and a 12,000 square feet (1,100 m^{2}) spa and health complex called the Aquarias Spa.

== Awards ==
In October 2007, the 23-bedroom hotel, at the time part of the Relais & Chateaux group, was voted ninth "Best Holiday and Wellness Hotel in the World" (number one in the UK) by the Swiss business publication Bilanz. Since 2017, the hotel has been a member and marketed through the Pride of Britain Hotels consortium.

The hotel has three restaurants: The Dining Room, Grey's Brasserie and The Green Room. The Dining Room won its first Michelin star in 2005 under head chef Martin Burge, and a second star in 2010. Burge left Whatley Manor in 2016 and was replaced by Niall Keating who gained his first Michelin star in 2017 and was awarded European Young Chef of the Year in 2018. In October 2019 Keating's Dining Room regained its second Michelin star. Keating competed in the 2020 series of the BBC television programme Great British Menu, where he won the regional heat, and went on to win the fish course and receive the "champion of champions" award in the final. After Keating left at the end of 2021, Ricki Weston was promoted to executive chef; as of 2022, the Dining Room has one Michelin star.

The hotel won the South West Tourism ‘Small Hotel of the Year Award 2020/21'.
