= Borough of Lambeth =

Borough of Lambeth may refer to:

- London Borough of Lambeth, England (1965—present)
- Metropolitan Borough of Lambeth (1900—1965)
