= Easton Grey =

Village in Wiltshire, England

Coordinates: 51.588°N 2.177°W

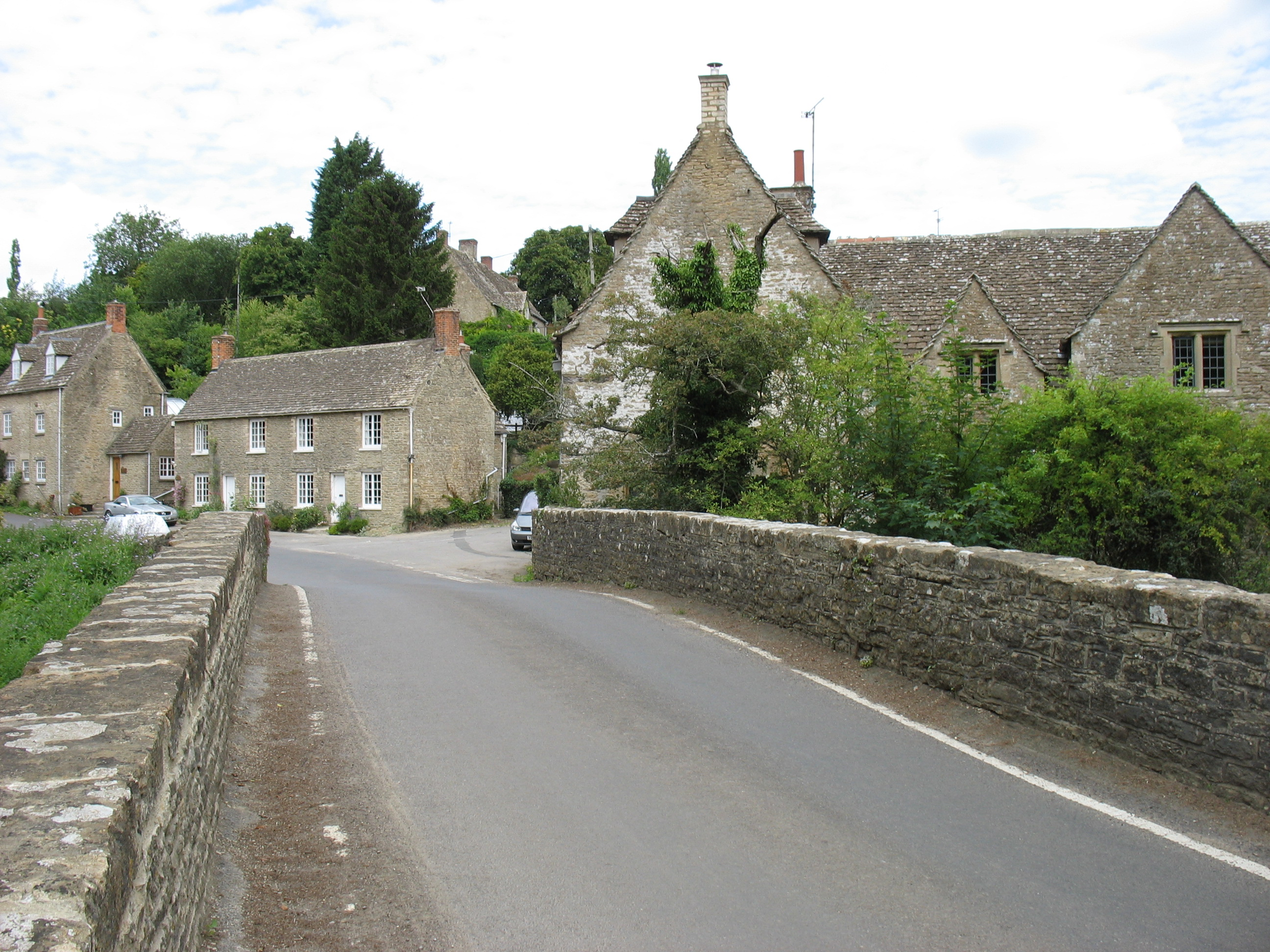
- Looking across the bridge over the Avon towards the village

- Location within Wiltshire
- Population: 83 (in 2011)
- OS grid reference: ST878877
- Civil parish: Easton Grey
- Unitary authority: Wiltshire
- Ceremonial county: Wiltshire
- Region: South West
- Country: England
- Sovereign state: United Kingdom
- Post town: Malmesbury
- Postcode district: SN16
- Dialling code: 01666
- Police: Wiltshire
- Fire: Dorset and Wiltshire
- Ambulance: South Western
- UK Parliament: South Cotswolds
- Website: Parish Council

Easton Grey is a small village and civil parish in north Wiltshire, England, on the county boundary with Gloucestershire. The village lies just south of the B4040 road between Malmesbury and Sherston, about 3.5 miles (6 km) west of Malmesbury. The Church of England parish church has a 15th-century tower and was rebuilt in 1836.

== Geography ==
The Sherston branch of the upper Bristol Avon crosses the parish from west to east. The parish is within the Cotswolds Area of Outstanding Natural Beauty.

== History ==
The Fosse Way Roman road forms the eastern boundary of the parish. Near where the Fosse Way crosses the river is the site of a large Romano-British roadside settlement, possibly with earlier origins; it includes a square earthwork enclosure within Whitewalls Wood.

The Domesday survey of 1086 recorded a small settlement called Estone with nine households and a mill. The later addition of the 'Grey' suffix may arise from a grant of the manor to John de Grey, Lord Wilton (d.1323).

The National Gazetteer of Great Britain and Ireland (1868) describes the village as small, and mentions an almshouse for six elderly women. The population of the parish peaked at over 600 around the middle of the 19th century but had declined to 326 by the 1901 census. The 20th century saw little change until numbers began to rise gradually in the 1980s, reaching 382 at the 2011 census.

The village has a 16th-century bridge over the Avon.

== Parish church ==
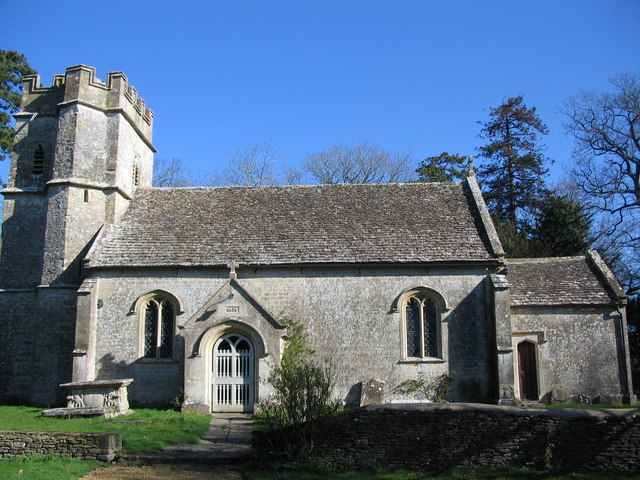
Parish church

The small parish church, which has no dedication, stands above the village near the Malmesbury-Sherston road. Its 15th-century roughcast west tower is described as humble by Pevsner; the rest is a rebuilding of 1836 to designs of William James, a Gloucestershire architect. In rubble stone with ashlar buttresses and stone slate roofs, the church has a nave, chancel and south porch; inside there is ribbed Gothic vaulting to the nave and chancel. The 1836 work was instigated by the vicar, William S. Birch, who also oversaw the building of a village school and (around 1830) a new vicarage. Most of the windows of the church were reworked later in the 19th century.

The font – a shallow bowl on a cylindrical pillar – is 13th-century. The pulpit is 17th-century, and there are wall monuments from 1680 and later in the chancel. The Gothic organ is from the early 19th century, while the box pews in the nave are from 1836. The three bells in the tower are said to be unringable; one is dated c.1399 and the others 1684.

The church was designated as Grade II* listed in 1959. Just outside the porch, a 1731 limestone chest tomb of the Adye family is in Rococo style with elaborate carving, and is Grade II* listed for its exceptional quality.

The benefice was united with Sherston in 1954, and consequently the vicarage at Easton Grey was sold. Today the parish is part of the Gauzebrook group of churches which is centred on Holy Cross Church, Sherston.

== Easton Grey House ==
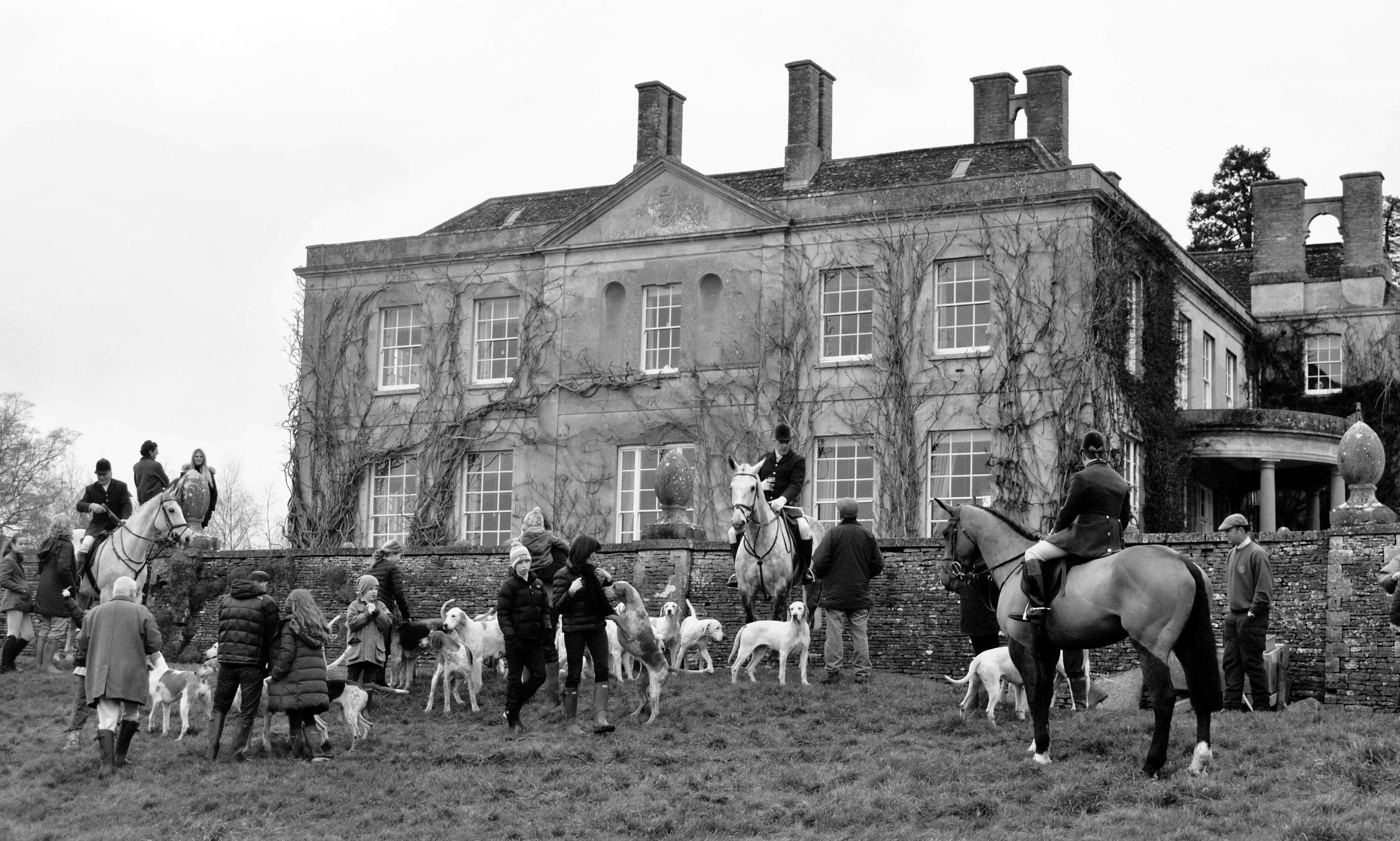
The Beaufort hunt at Easton Grey House, 2015

The country house known as Easton Grey House stands west of the church, overlooking the river and the village. Built after 1792 for Walter Hodges, the two-storey house has a five-bay south-east front, its central bay brought slightly forward under a broad pediment bearing the Parry-Hodges arms. The north-east front has a large semicircular porch on columns, built in the early 19th century, and attached to the north is a three-storey block of c.1880. Inside are fine chimney-pieces and a stone staircase with wrought iron railings.

By the 1880s the house was owned by Thomas Graham Smith, who in 1879 married Katherine Lucy Tennant (1860–1942, known as Lucy). She was a daughter of the wealthy industrialist Sir Charles Tennant, and a member – alongside three of her sisters – of the social circle known as The Souls; thus the house became one of the group's retreats. Lucy's sister Margot married H. H. Asquith in 1894, and the house was a favourite resort of her husband during his 1908–1916 premiership. One source states that the house is currently owned by Michael Green, co-founder of media company Carlton Communications, who retrained as a psychotherapist.

Gardens were made to the west of the house in the late 18th century, with an ornamental gateway, a loggia and a walled kitchen garden. These features were rearranged c.1880 when formal garden areas were added. The north lodge, single-storey with tall chimneys, is described as "very Victorian" by Orbach.

== Other landmarks ==
On an elevated site in the village, Ruckley House is a two-storey 17th-century farmhouse which was extended in the 18th and early 20th centuries, and in 1953. A range of outbuildings includes a large barn which is probably also 17th-century.

In the east of the parish, on the Malmesbury road, is the site of Easton Grey Camp or 89 Working Camp, which held Italian prisoners-of-war during the Second World War, and German prisoners from 1945 to 1948. The site had a standard design, with rows of narrow wooden huts (some of them still standing) and redbrick buildings including a water tower; prisoners were required to work, mostly in local agriculture. Today the site is in mixed light industrial use and is also home to a pre-school and after-school childcare business.

Just beyond the eastern boundary of the parish, Whatley Manor – originally a farmhouse, greatly enlarged in the 1920s and 2001–3 – is operated as a hotel and Michelin-starred restaurant. The food company Tracklements operates a factory in the village with a solar panel installation.

== Local government ==
The parish is in the area of Wiltshire Council unitary authority, which performs all significant local government functions. Owing to its small population, there is no parish council; instead the first tier of local government is a parish meeting.
