= Sherston, Wiltshire =

Village in Wiltshire, England

Coordinates: 51°34′22″N 2°12′43″W

Sherston
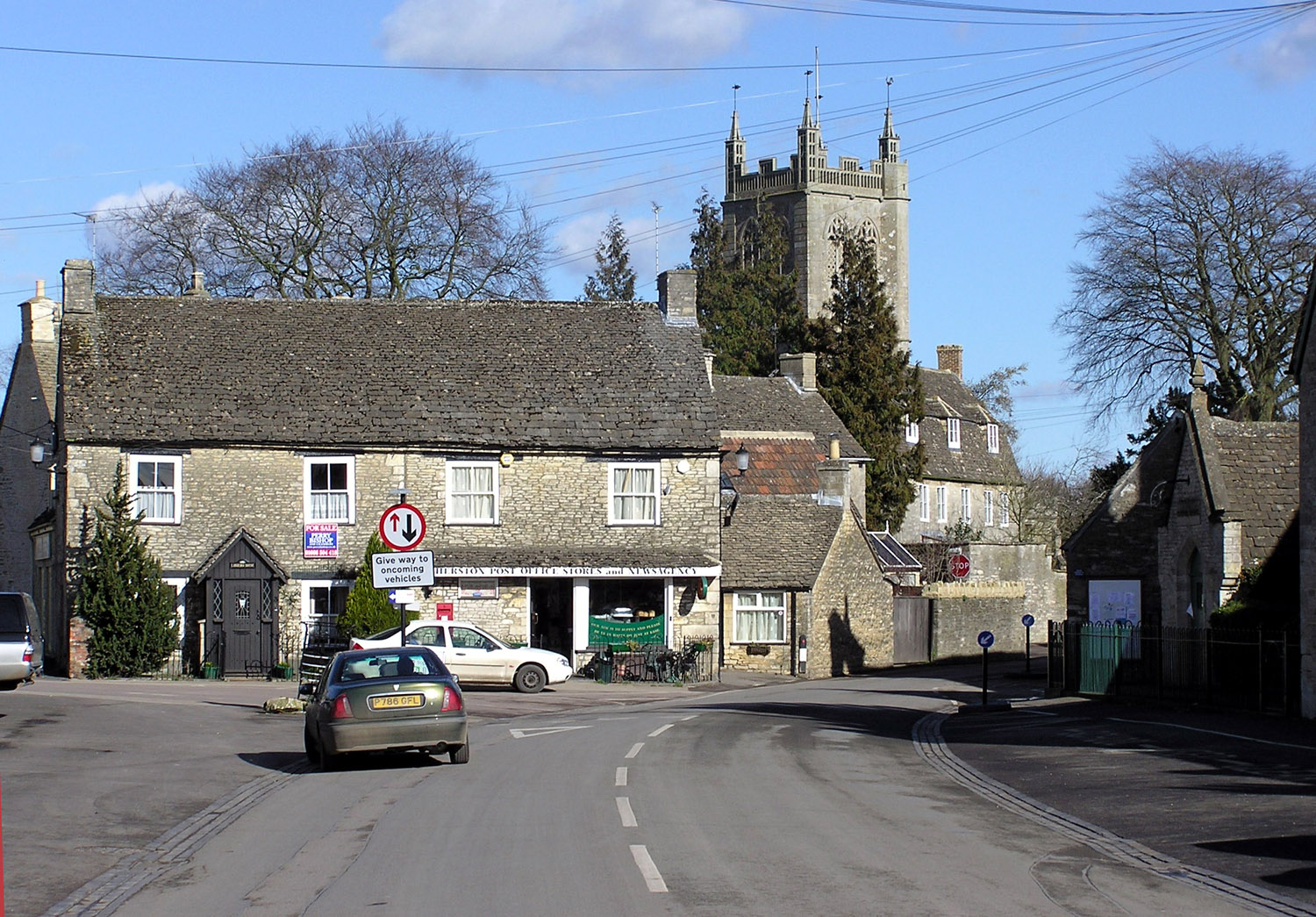
- Post office and parish church

- Location within Wiltshire
- Population: 1,639 (in 2011)
- OS grid reference: ST853859
- Civil parish: Sherston
- Unitary authority: Wiltshire
- Ceremonial county: Wiltshire
- Region: South West
- Country: England
- Sovereign state: United Kingdom
- Post town: Malmesbury
- Postcode district: SN16
- Dialling code: 01666
- Police: Wiltshire
- Fire: Dorset and Wiltshire
- Ambulance: South Western
- UK Parliament: South Cotswolds
- Website: Parish Council

Sherston is a village and civil parish about 5 miles (8 km) west of Malmesbury in Wiltshire, England. The parish is bounded to the north by the county boundary with Gloucestershire, and to the southeast by the Fosse Way, a Roman road. The parish includes the hamlets of Easton Town, immediately east of Sherston; Pinkney, further east along the Malmesbury road; and Willesley, to the north.

The infant River Avon passes Sherston, Easton Town and Pinkney, on its way to Malmesbury. The parish lies within the Cotswolds Area of Outstanding Natural Beauty.

== History ==
The Fosse Way, a major Roman road, passes nearby and forms the southeastern boundary of the modern parish. A Romano-British farmhouse from around 350 was discovered at Vancelettes Farm, north of Sherston village. The earliest surviving record of Sherston, then called Scorranstone, is an Anglo-Saxon document of 896.

In 1016, a battle between Cnut the Great and a West Saxon army led by King Edmund Ironside on the hills around Sherston may have involved a local hero known as Rattlebone; his name is celebrated in a local pub, The Rattlebone Inn. The parish church was built or rebuilt in the 12th century, and at some point a borough was laid out south of the church, with a broad market place where a weekly market was held from 1241 or earlier.

In 1511 a fire destroyed most of the buildings. Later in that century Sherston had two inns, the Swan and the Angel; there was much rebuilding in the 17th century. Industry came to the village in 1872 when a silk mill was opened by Joseph Davenport and Sons, weaving silks and ribbons, and later cotton; the mill closed in 1922. For a while after the Second World War, the Plant Engineering Co of Birmingham had a factory in the former silk mill.

Most of Sherston village was designated as a Conservation Area in 1973.

Sherston Software, makers of educational games, was established in 1984 and continued in business in the village until 2015.

Pinkney was also called Sherston Parva, meaning Little Sherston. The Ordnance Survey map from the 1890s has "Great Sherston" and "Sherston Parva or Pinkney"; by 1951 Great Sherston had become Sherston but both names were still shown for the smaller place.

=== Landowners ===
The Estcourt family of Pinkney were influential at Malmesbury in the 17th century, for a time holding the post of high steward of the borough. Notable members included Sir Thomas Estcourt (died 1683), and his son Sir Thomas Estcourt (died 1702). The latter's son, also Thomas, died in 1704 and the estate passed to his sister Elizabeth, who in 1709 married Richard Creswell (1688–1743), from a family of Shropshire landowners: she brought to the marriage the manors of Sherston, Malmesbury and Norton. Their son Thomas Estcourt Cresswell (1712–1788), seated at Pinkney Park, was returned to parliament for Wootton Bassett; there is a monument to him in the parish church.

== Governance ==
The civil parish elects a parish council. It is in the area of Wiltshire Council, a unitary authority, which performs most significant local government functions.

An electoral ward with the same name exists, consisting of the parishes of Luckington, Sherston, Sopworth, Easton Grey, Norton, St Paul Malmesbury Without, and Brokenborough. The population of the ward at the 2011 census was 4,822.

== Religious sites ==
The Church of England parish church, the Grade I listed Church of the Holy Cross, dates from the 12th century and has a high tower which was rebuilt in 1733. Nikolaus Pevsner called the church "impressive" in his Buildings of England volume.

A Congregational church was licensed at Cliff Road in 1825. It remained in use until c. 2013 and was sold for residential use.

A Primitive Methodist chapel was opened at Grove Lane in 1851, and became Sherston Methodist Church in 1932 after the union of the Primitive Methodists with the Wesleyan Methodists. The church was sold in 2024 and converted for residential use.

== Notable buildings ==
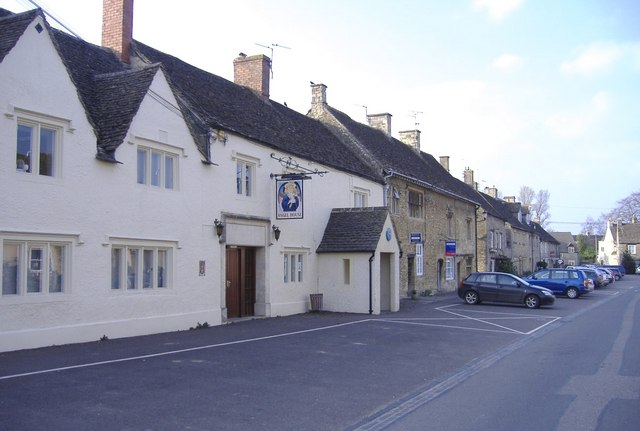
West side of the High Street, 2007

Sherston village has two groups of Grade II* listed buildings. On the High Street, Old Swan House and numbers 19 and 21 comprise the former Swan Inn, from the late 16th century. Court House in Court Street and the adjoining houses at 1 and 3 Cliff Road were rebuilt c. 1680; for a time part of the ground floor of Court House served as the village shop.

Other listed buildings on the High Street include the former Angel Hotel, which has a 16th-century core and a twin-gabled addition of 1648.

At Pinkney, the large 19th-century Pinkney Park has been demolished, although still standing are the 17th-century granary and 1791 coach house. Further north, Pinkney Court is a farmhouse of c.1600 which was remodelled for Sir Thomas Estcourt around 1680; it has a five-bay front and is described by Julian Orbach (updating Pevsner) as "a lovely group with its outbuildings".

In the north of the parish, Willesley House is probably a medieval hall, rebuilt in 1583 and re-fronted in the late 17th century or early 18th.

== Schools ==
Members of the Congregational chapel built a British School Room at Cliff Road in 1844. Its pupils were transferred to the National School in 1895 and the building has served various community purposes; in 2015 it was a meeting room and club room.

A National School was opened near the Rattlebone Inn in 1846. It became a Church of England school and was extended in 1895. Children of all ages were educated until 1954 when it became a junior school. Growth in pupil numbers led to the building of a new school on the outskirts of the village, which was opened in 2005. The old school was bought by the parish council in 2011 and is home to shops and businesses, including the Post Office Stores.

== Amenities ==
Every year, on the Saturday closest to 14 July, a carnival is held. The main attraction is a boules tournament and a music evening with local bands.

Sherston has a football team, a cricket team and a Scout troop. The village has a shop and post office, a hotel/cafe (the Angel Cafe), another cafe (Lucy Toms), one pub: the Rattlebone Inn and an Indian Restaurant called The Bridge on the site of the old Carpenters Arms. Another pub, the Holford Arms, is in the extreme northwest of the parish at Knockdown, Gloucestershire.

== Notable people ==
George Strong (1833–1888), an agricultural worker who was awarded the Victoria Cross for bravery during the Crimean War, settled in Sherston after the war and is buried in an unmarked grave in the churchyard.

In the 1970s and 1980s Sherston was the home of eccentric socialite Lady Edith Foxwell, and her friend the soul singer Marvin Gaye was a frequent visitor. Until his death in 2002, the actor John Thaw lived nearby with his wife, the actress Sheila Hancock.
