= Battle of Sherston =

1016 battle of Cnut's invasion of England

- Part of Cnut's invasion of England
Date	25–26 June 1016
Location	Sherston, England
Result	West Saxon victory

Belligerents
West Saxons	Denmark; Danish-allied English

Commanders and leaders
Edmund Ironside	Cnut; Eiríkr Hákonarson; Eadric Streona; Thorkell the Tall (possibly)

The battle of Sherston was fought in Sherston, Wiltshire in England, from 25 to 26 June 1016. between the forces of King Edmund Ironside and Danish king Cnut as a part of Cnut's invasion of England. The West Saxons, fighting for Edmund, were victorious against the Danish and their English allies.

== Background ==
King Sweyn Forkbeard of Denmark successfully conquered England by winter of 1014. However, he died just weeks later. The remaining Danish army declared Cnut king, but they were driven out by the English the same year. Cnut launched a massive invasion in the summer of 1015 to reconquer England. Landing in East Anglia, they marched south to Wessex and then north to subdue Northumbria. In April 1016, king Æthelred the Unready died, most of the English nobility declared Cnut king but the nobility in London crowned Æthelred’s eldest son, Edmund Ironside. Right before the Danes laid siege to London, Edmund rode into Wessex, where the West Saxons declared allegiance to him. Upon hearing of Edmund in Wessex, the Danes did a forced march south, where the two armies fought at Penselwood. Shortly after, they met again at Sherston.

== Battle ==
The fighting happened on the hills around Sherston. There is little certain information on the specific course of battle. Medieval historian John of Worcester wrote an extended description of it: Edmund drew up his army, moving the best soldiers to the front and placing the rest of the army in reserve. He then addressed the front soldiers each by name, telling them to remember that they were fighting for "country, children, wives, and homes", which motivated them. He then ordered a trumpet to sound. The West Saxons advanced gradually, then Cnut's army. They fought intensely with spears and lances. Edmund joined the battle, fighting hand-to-hand combat on the front line, and often "smote the enemy". However, in 1990, an academic disagreement started on the validity of this description. Bernard Bachrach believed that John's description was an accurate telling, while Richard Abels and Stephen Morillo theorized the account is an edited version of excerpts from Sallust's Roman histories (Catiline and the Jugurthine War) mixed with slim details of the Battle of Sherston from the Anglo-Saxon Chronicle.

In any case, it is known that the West Saxons formed into an infantry phalanx and advanced towards Cnut's army. The two sides fought intensely for two days before being called away from the battlefield, the West Saxons winning. Legend states that the leader of the West Saxon militia was named John Rattlebone, and that he was injured in battle, but continued to fight, holding in his innards using a nearby piece of stone. Throkell the Tall potentially fought for the Danish.

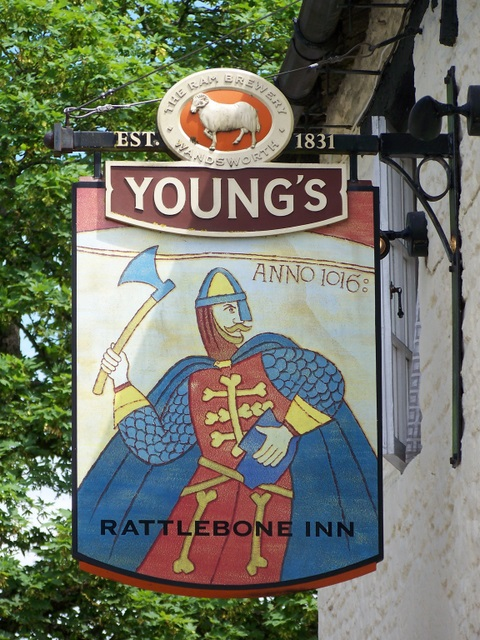
John Rattlebone, as depicted on the sign for the modern-day Rattlebone Inn

== Legacy ==
The West Saxons' victory was cancelled out by their later loss at Assandun. Cnut was made King of England later in 1016.

The battle is memorialized throughout modern Sherston. There is an inn in town named the Rattlebone Inn, and he appears on the badges for the Sherston primary school. There was a festival in 2016 commemorating the 1000-year anniversary of the battle, organized by the 1016 Society.
