= The Rattlebone Inn =

Inn in Sherston, Wiltshire, England, UK

Coordinates: 51°34′20″N 2°12′44″W

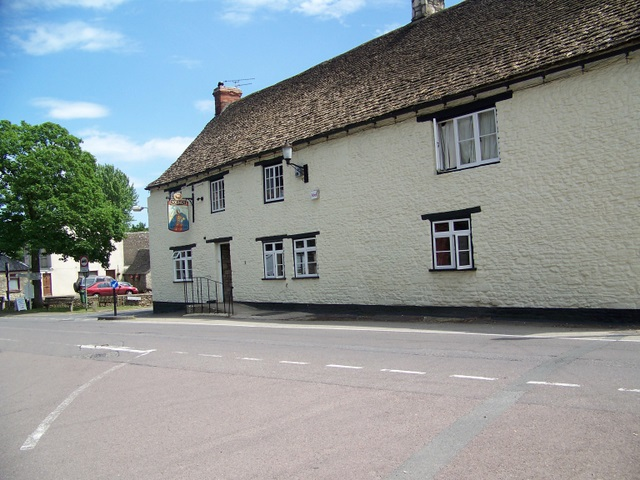
The Rattlebone Inn from Church Street

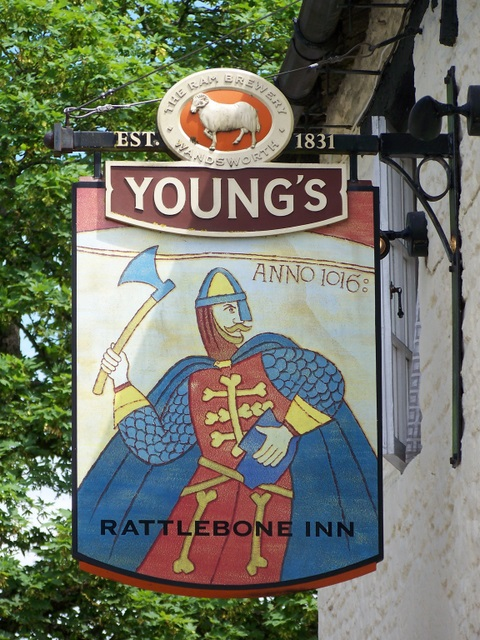
The sign of the inn, depicting Rattlebone

The Rattlebone Inn is a public house in Sherston, Wiltshire, England. It has been listed Grade II on the National Heritage List for England since December 1986. The inn is named for Rattlebone, who fought for Edmund Ironside against King Cnut at the Battle of Sherston in 1016. A major fire occurred at the pub in March 2014. The pub is popular with members of the nearby Beaufort Hunt.

The pub has three boules pitches, and hosts turnip tossing competitions.
