= Old Town Hall, Kennington Road =

Municipal building in London, England

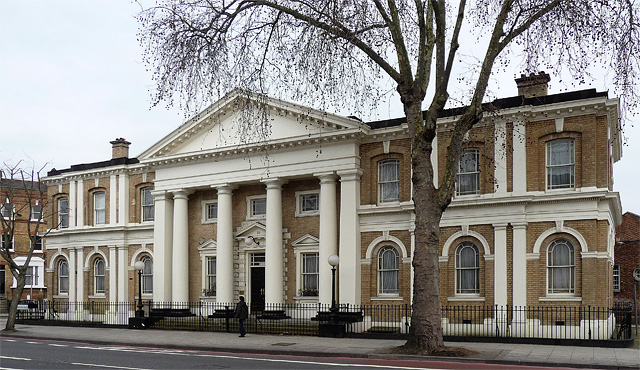
- Old Town Hall, Kennington Road

- Shown in Lambeth
- 51.4867°N 0.1111°W
- Location: Kennington Road, Kennington

History
- Built: 1853

Site notes
- Architect(s): Raymond Willshire and Robert Parris
- Architectural style: Neoclassical style

Listed Building – Grade II
- Official name: Old Town Hall (Church of England Children's Society), Kennington Road, SE11
- Designated: 27 March 1981
- Reference no.: 1080399

The Old Town Hall is a former municipal building in Kennington Road, Kennington, London, England. The town hall, which was briefly the headquarters of the Metropolitan Borough of Lambeth, is a Grade II listed building.

== History ==
The building was commissioned to replace the old vestry hall of the parish of Lambeth in Church Street (now known as Lambeth Road) which had been completed in 1809. The site selected by the Lambeth Vestry for the new building, on the east side of Kennington Road, had not previously been developed because of its dampness: it had previously formed part of the estate of the Manor of Kennington which was in the ownership of the Duchy of Cornwall. The proposed development was seen by some members of the vestry as extravagant and was only authorised after a poll of ratepayers: the vestry then secured a long lease from the duchy.

The new building was designed by the local architects, Raymond Willshire and Robert Parris, in the neoclassical style, built by William Higgs in buff brick with stone dressings and was completed in September 1853. The design involved a symmetrical main frontage with nine bays facing onto Kennington Road; the central section of three bays, which projected forward, formed a tetrastyle portico with four full-height Tuscan order columns and two antae supporting an entablature, a modillioned cornice and a modillioned pediment. The three-bay single-storey outer sections were fenestrated by round headed windows with architraves and keystones flanked by paired pilasters supporting entablatures. Internally, the principal room was the main assembly hall which featured a gallery at one end and an apse at the other end.

The outer sections was increased in height when an extra storey was added to each section to create more office space in 1873. After the area became a metropolitan borough in 1900, the civic leaders decided that the old building was inadequate for their needs and decided to procure a much larger building at the corner of Brixton Hill and Acre Lane, Brixton which opened as Lambeth Town Hall in 1908.

The lease on the vacant building in Kennington Road was assigned to the Church of England Incorporated Society for Providing Homes for Waifs and Strays in 1909 and the building became its headquarters: King George V visited the building to meet the society's children in 1935. During the Second World War, the water and gas supplies outside the building were hit by enemy bombing creating considerable concerns about the welfare and safety of the children inside.

The building remained the society's headquarters until, as The Children's Society, it relocated to new offices at Kings Cross in July 1986. The building was refurbished to a design by Rolfe Judd in 1995 and then served as the headquarters of the Countryside Alliance from the early 21st century until 2015. Following a further refurbishment, which was completed in 2016, the building became a creative hub for film production businesses.
