= Metropolitan Borough of Lambeth =

Metropolitan borough of England

Coordinates: 51.4607°N 0.1166°W

Lambeth
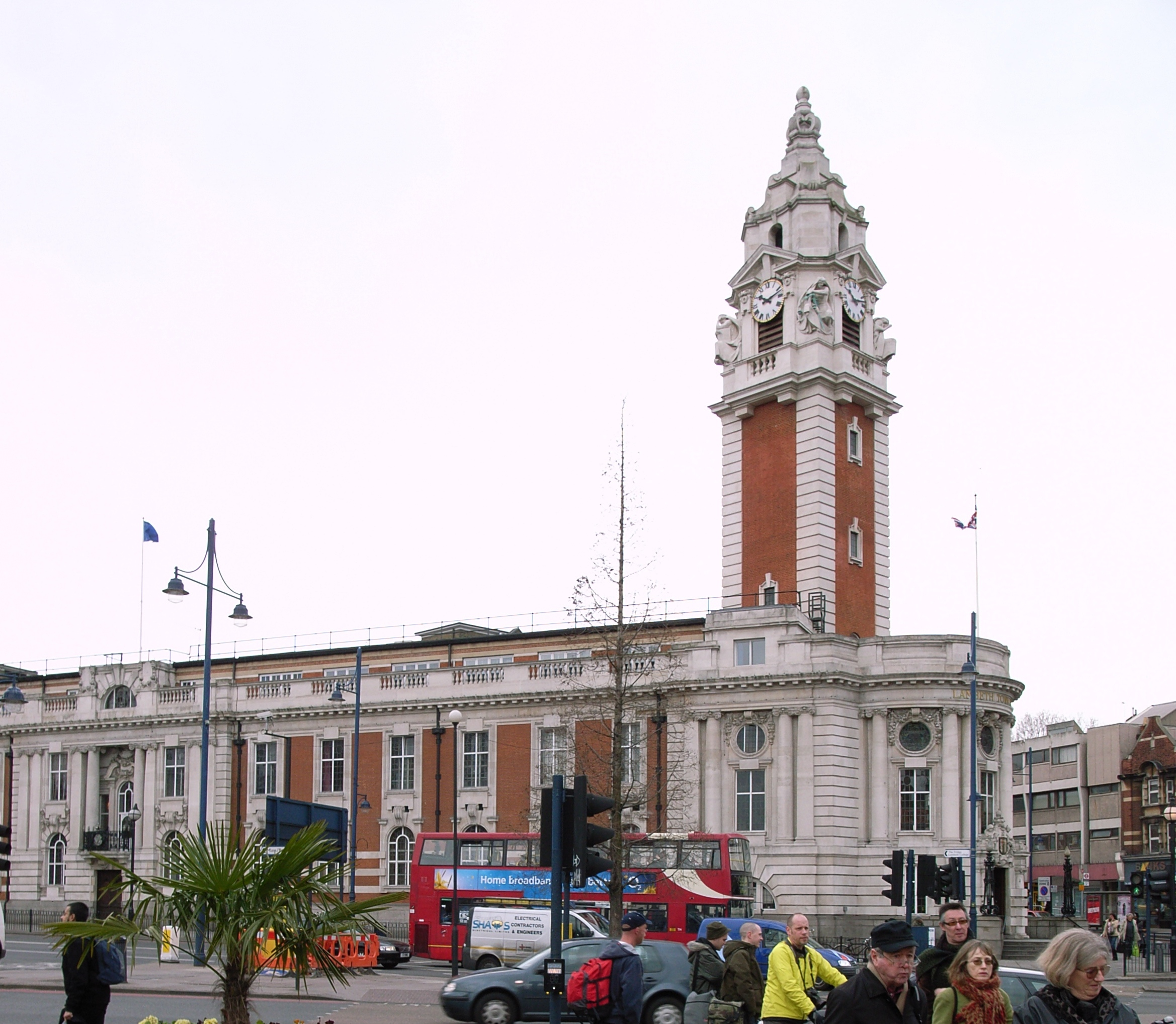
- Lambeth Town Hall

- Lambeth within the County of London
- History
  - Origin: Ancient parish
  - Created: 1900
  - Abolished: 1965
  - Succeeded by: London Borough of Lambeth
- Status: Metropolitan borough
- Government: Lambeth Vestry (until 1900, reformed 1855); Lambeth Borough Council (1900–1965)
  - HQ: St Mary's Church (until 1809); Vestry Hall, Church Street (1809–1853); Vestry Hall, Kennington Road (1853–1908); Town Hall, Brixton Hill (1908–1965)
  - Motto: Spectemur Agendo (Let us be regarded according to our conduct)
- Coat of arms of the borough council
- Map of borough boundary

Lambeth was a civil parish and metropolitan borough in south London, England. It was an ancient parish in the county of Surrey. The parish was included in the area of responsibility of the Metropolitan Board of Works in 1855 and became part of the County of London in 1889. The parish of Lambeth became a metropolitan borough in 1900, following the London Government Act 1899, with the parish vestry replaced by a borough council.

== Geography ==
The ancient parish was divided into the six divisions of Bishop's Liberty, Prince's Liberty, Vauxhall Liberty, Marsh and Wall Liberty, Lambeth Dean and Stockwell Liberty.

It covered an area 4,015 acres (recorded in 1851 census) and was 7 miles (11.3 km) north to south, but only 2.75 miles (4.4 km) at its widest east to west. In addition to the historic riverside area of Lambeth, this included Kennington, Vauxhall, Stockwell, Brixton, the western part of Herne Hill, Tulse Hill and West Norwood.

As the population was increasing, in 1824 the ancient parish was subdivided into ecclesiastical districts of Brixton, Kennington, Lambeth Church, Waterloo Road and West Norwood. These districts were adopted for census reporting in 1841 with Lambeth Church and Waterloo Road further subdivided into first and second divisions.

In 1900 some irregular boundaries of the parish were tidied up:

- The Streatham exclave completely surrounded by Camberwell and Lambeth was transferred to Lambeth (population 3,453)
- The Camberwell/Lambeth boundary was tidied up with an exchange of population (approximately 6,000 each way) which had the effect of transferring Myatt's Fields Park to Lambeth

== Ecclesiastical parish ==
The ancient parish, dedicated to St Mary, was in the Diocese of Winchester until 1877, then the Diocese of Rochester until 1905, and then finally in the Diocese of Southwark. From 1824, as the population of Lambeth increased, a number of new parishes were formed:

- St John the Evangelist, Waterloo in 1824
- St Luke, West Norwood in 1824
- St Mark, Kennington in 1824
- St Matthew, Brixton in 1824
- Holy Trinity, Lambeth in 1841
- St Mary the Less, Lambeth in 1842
- St Michael, Stockwell in 1845
- St Andrew, Waterloo in 1846
- St Thomas, Waterloo in 1846
- All Saints, Waterloo in 1847
- St Barnabas, Kennington South in 1851
- St John the Evangelist, Angell Town Brixton in 1853
- Christ Church, North Brixton in 1856
- Holy Trinity, Tulse Hill in 1856
- St Peter, Vauxhall in 1861
- St Stephen, South Lambeth in 1861
- St Philip in 1864
- St Andrew, Stockwell Green in 1868
- St Saviour, Herne Hill Road in 1868
- St Anne, South Lambeth in 1869
- Emmanuel, Lambeth in 1869
- St Jude, Brixton in 1869
- St John, Kennington 1872
- All Saints, South Lambeth in 1874
- St James, Kennington in 1875
- St Saviour, Brixton Hill in 1876
- St Catherine, Loughborough Park in 1877
- St Paul, Ferndale Road in 1882
- St Matthias, Upper Tulse Hill in 1900
- St Anselm, Kennington Cross in 1901

In addition, as the population of neighbouring areas increased, parts of Lambeth parish were included in new parishes:

- St Paul, Herne Hill in 1845 with parts of St Giles, Camberwell
- St Agnes, Kennington Park in 1874 with parts of St Mary, Newington

== Political history ==
=== Vestry ===
Under the Metropolis Management Act 1855 any parish that exceeded 2,000 ratepayers was to be divided into wards; as such the incorporated vestry of St Mary Lambeth was divided into eight wards (electing vestrymen): No. 1 or North Marsh (18), No. 2 or South Marsh (12), No. 3 or Bishop's (12), No. 4 or Prince's (15), No. 5 or Vauxhall (24), No. 6 or Stockwell (15), No. 7 or Brixton (15) and No. 8 or Norwood (9).

=== Borough council ===
A map showing the wards of Lambeth Metropolitan Borough as they appeared in 1916.

The borough council was established in 1900. The metropolitan borough was divided into nine wards for elections: Bishop's, Brixton, Herne Hill, Marsh, Norwood, Prince's, Stockwell, Tulse Hill and Vauxhall. The borough council was controlled by the Municipal Reform Party (allied to the Conservatives) until 1937, when the Labour Party gained power. Labour retained control until abolition in 1965.

=== Parliament constituency ===
For elections to parliament, a borough constituency for Lambeth was established under the Reform Act 1832. Parliamentary boundaries were redrawn in 1885 with the parish divided into four constituencies:

- Lambeth, Brixton
- Lambeth, Kennington
- Lambeth, North
- Lambeth, Norwood

In 1950 the borough's representation was reduced to three seats:

- Lambeth, Brixton
- Lambeth, Norwood
- Lambeth, Vauxhall

== Town hall ==
Lambeth Town Hall was built in Brixton in 1906 to 1908 to designs by Septimus Warwick and H. Austen Hall. It replaced the Old Town Hall in Kennington Road. The building is constructed of red brick and Portland stone, with a 41-metre (130 ft) high clock tower. Since 1965 it has formed the headquarters of the successor London Borough.

In the stairwell of the hall is a plaque erected by the Government of Ontario to commemorate the birthplace of John By, who helped create Bytown or Ottawa, Ontario (capital of Canada).

== Population and area ==
The area of the borough in 1901 was 4,080 acres (16.5 km^{2}). By 1961 it had increased slightly to 4,089 acres (16.5 km^{2}). The population of the metropolitan borough as recorded at each census was as follows:

Lambeth Vestry 1801–1899

Year	1801	1811	1821	1831	1841	1851	1861	1871	1881	1891
Population	27,985	41,644	57,638	87,856	115,888	139,325	162,044	208,342	253,699	275,203

Metropolitan Borough 1900–1961

Year	1901	1911	1921	1931	1941	1951	1961
Population	301,895	298,058	302,863	296,147		230,240	223,763

== Coat of arms ==
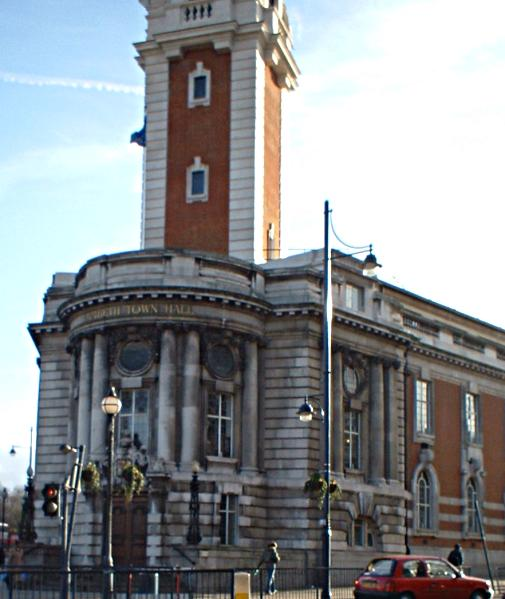
Lambeth Town Hall in Brixton

The original seal of the borough

When the borough was created in 1900, the corporation adopted a seal which was used in place of a coat of arms. The device was derived from that of the borough's forerunner, Lambeth Vestry. At the base of the seal was a lamb, a play on the name "Lambeth", and a symbol long used to represent the parish. The two shields were those of the Diocese of Canterbury and the Duchy of Cornwall. The first referred to Lambeth Palace, residence of the Archbishop of Canterbury. The second was to show that the Duchy owned estates in the Kennington area of the borough. The design was completed by the cypher of Queen Victoria, and the year of the borough's founding. This device can still be seen in the circular hall of Lambeth Town Hall.

In 1922 the borough obtained an official grant of arms from the College of Arms. The lamb was moved to the crest, on top of the helm. It was transformed into a paschal lamb supporting a pennon of St George. As a number of other crests featured a paschal lamb, a silver and blue wave, for the River Thames, was added. The arms themselves retained references to the Duchy of Cornwall (the black border charged with bezants or gold discs) and the Archbishop of Canterbury (the mitre and crozier). The red cross in the first quarter was taken from the arms of the London County Council, showing that the borough was in the county. The fourth quarter contained a gold and blue chequered pattern, the arms of the de Warennes, Earls of Surrey. This was included to show that Lambeth lay in the county of Surrey until 1889. The ermine patterning in the other quarter was said to stand for "purity and honour".

The motto adopted was Spectemur Agendo, a motto common to several local authorities in England. Although this is generally rendered in English as Judge us by our deeds, the official translation in Lambeth has traditionally been the more ponderous Let us be regarded according to our conduct.

On 22 February 1966 the arms were transferred by royal licence to the London Borough of Lambeth. On registration at the College of Arms, two gold stars were added in the second and third quarters to depict the addition of Clapham and Streatham to Lambeth.

== Abolition ==
In 1965 the borough was amalgamated with the Streatham and Clapham parts of the Metropolitan Borough of Wandsworth to form the new London Borough of Lambeth.
