= Canada House =

Offices of the High Commission of Canada in the United Kingdom

Canada House Maison du Canada
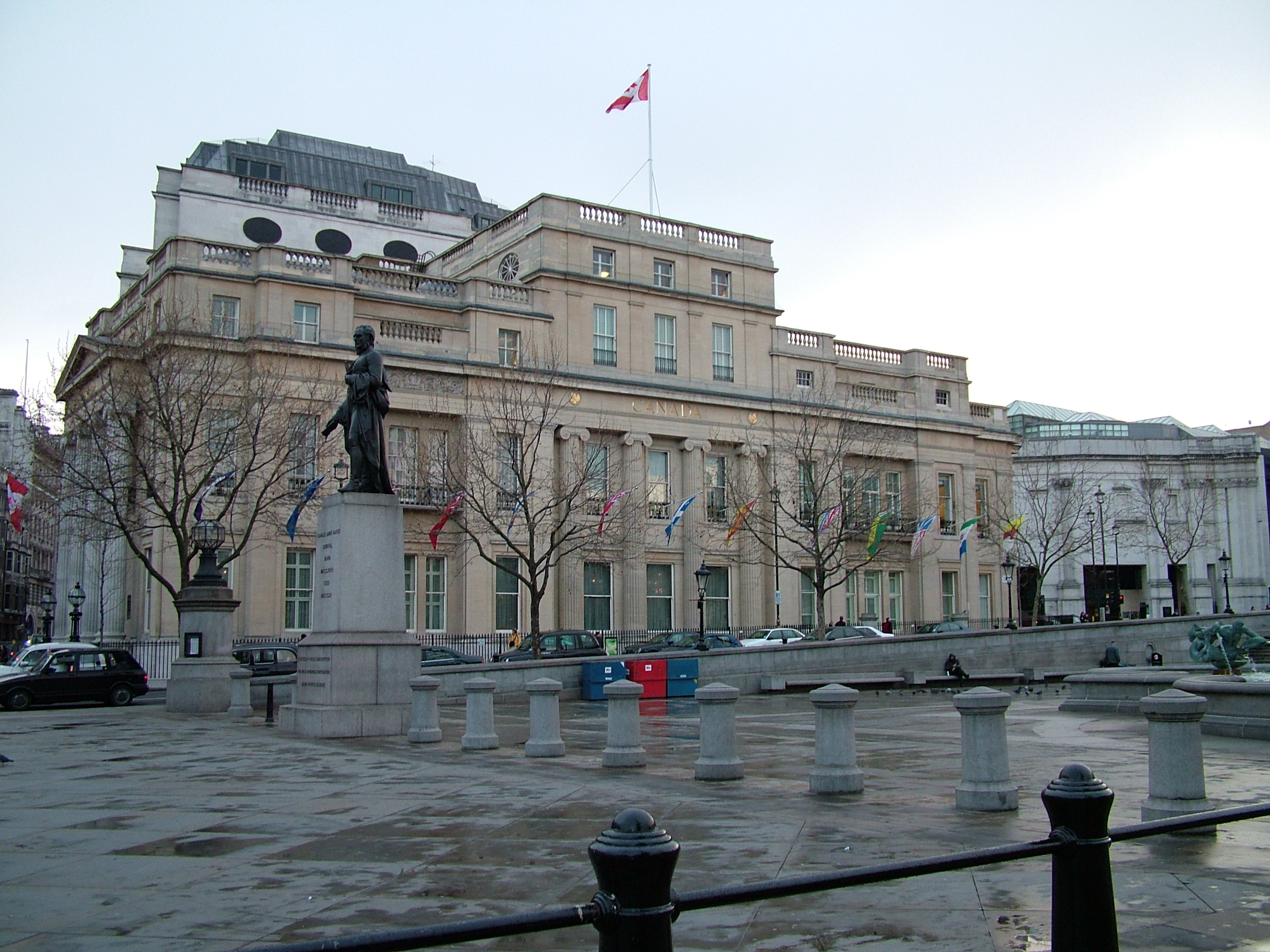
- Canada House
- Interactive map of the Canada House; Maison du Canada area
- Former names: Union Club, Royal College of Physicians

General information
- Type: Office building, cultural centre
- Architectural style: Greek Revival
- Location: Trafalgar Square; London, WC2
- Coordinates: 51.5079°N 0.1294°W
- Current tenants: High Commission of Canada in London
- Construction started: 1824
- Completed: 1827; 199 years ago
- Owner: The Crown Estate, leased by the Canadian Government

Design and construction
- Architect: Robert Smirke
- Other designers: Septimus Warwick

Canada House (French: Maison du Canada) is a Greek Revival building on Trafalgar Square in London. It has been a Grade II* Listed Building since 1970. It has served as the chancery of the High Commission of Canada in the United Kingdom since 1925.

== History ==
The building which would later become known as Canada House was built between 1824 and 1827 to designs by Sir Robert Smirke, the architect of the British Museum. It was originally two buildings used by the Union Club and the Royal College of Physicians. Under the leadership of High Commissioner Peter Charles Larkin, the Canadian government acquired the Union Club in 1923 for the sum of £223,000. It was Larkin's intention to centralise the work of 200 Canadian employees scattered among offices in Victoria Street in one central building. Renovations cost $1.3 million CDN and were supervised by the architect Septimus Warwick, who moved the main entrance from Trafalgar Square to Cockspur Street. The designers imported Canadian furniture, carpets and maple and birch flooring. The exterior was reclad in Portland stone to match the façade of the Royal College of Physicians. The building was officially opened on 29 June 1925 by King George V.

When he declared Canada House open, King George said: "Canada is a great country: alike in the literal sense of vast extent from 'sea to sea' and great in achievement and in promise: and it is right and necessary that its official representatives here should be housed in a manner worthy of the Dominion and adequate to the discharge of their ever-growing and important duties."

During the London Blitz, a bomb fell near the building, only 20 yards (18 m) away from future Canadian prime minister Lester B. Pearson, who was the secretary to the High Commissioner at the time. Canada increased its presence by acquiring the future Macdonald House, located at 1 Grosvenor Square in Mayfair, in 1961.

In 1993, Canada House was closed by the Canadian government as a cost-cutting measure with the intention of selling it. A change of government in Canada saw this decision reversed and renovations were planned instead, beginning in 1997. The building was officially reopened by Queen Elizabeth II, as Queen of Canada, in May 1998. To commemorate the reopening, a detachment from the 3rd Battalion, Princess Patricia's Canadian Light Infantry, came to London and mounted the Queen's Guard at Buckingham Palace.

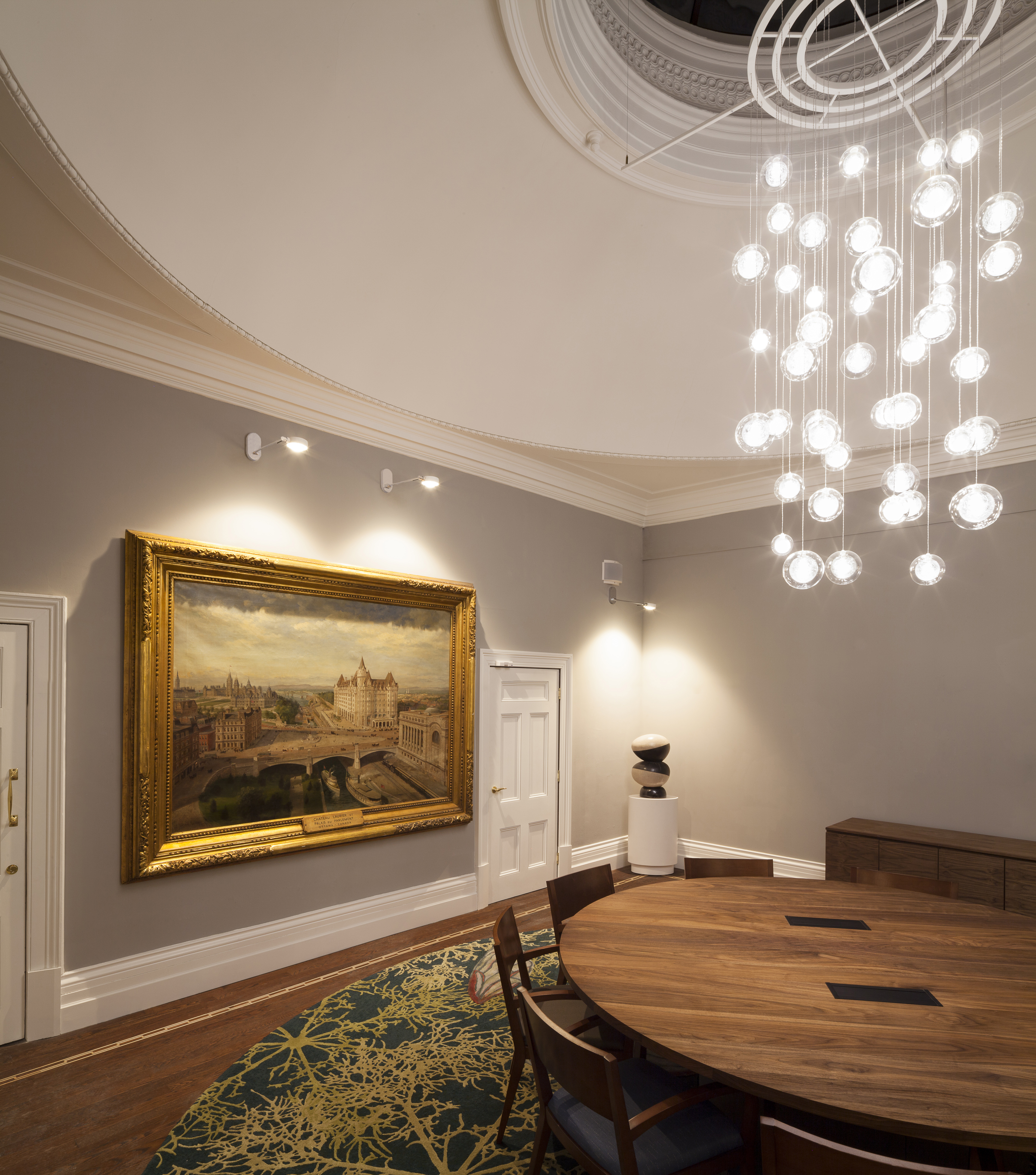
The Ontario Room, Canada House

Canada House was closed again in 2010 and re-opened in 2012 for the Diamond Jubilee. It was used as Canada Olympic House during the 2012 Summer Olympics in London. The main work of the High Commission, including consular, public affairs, political, trade and administrative functions was then carried out from Macdonald House in Mayfair.

In February 2013, the Government of Canada announced that it would consolidate its diplomatic presence at Canada House and sell off Macdonald House. As part of the plan, the building next door to Canada House, known as 2-4 Cockspur Street, was acquired by Canada in 2013 (until this date 2-4 Cockspur Street served as headquarters of the Department for Culture, Media and Sport). The building at 2-4 Cockspur Street was constructed between 1926 and 1929 for Sun Life Assurance Company of Canada and had served as the Canadian Army's overseas headquarters in London during World War II. Over the next two years, 2-4 Cockspur Street and Canada House were renovated. As part of the renovation, 2-4 Cockspur Street was joined to Canada House in July 2014. In November 2013, Macdonald House was sold, although as part of the transaction the diplomatic staff was permitted to stay until the renovations to Canada House were completed and the diplomatic staff did not move to Canada House until December 2014.

The Canadian High Commission transferred all of its diplomatic functions to Canada House on 15 December 2014. The Queen and the Duke of Edinburgh once again officially reopened Canada House on 19 February 2015.

== Current functions ==
Canada House is the home of the High Commission of Canada in the United Kingdom. It hosts consular facilities for Canadians to renew passports or apply for emergency assistance, visa and immigration processing services, a military liaison office, trade officers, political officers and a public affairs section. Canada House is used for special events, hosting conferences, receptions, lectures and lunches. The Canada House Gallery stages exhibitions of historical and contemporary art and artefacts.

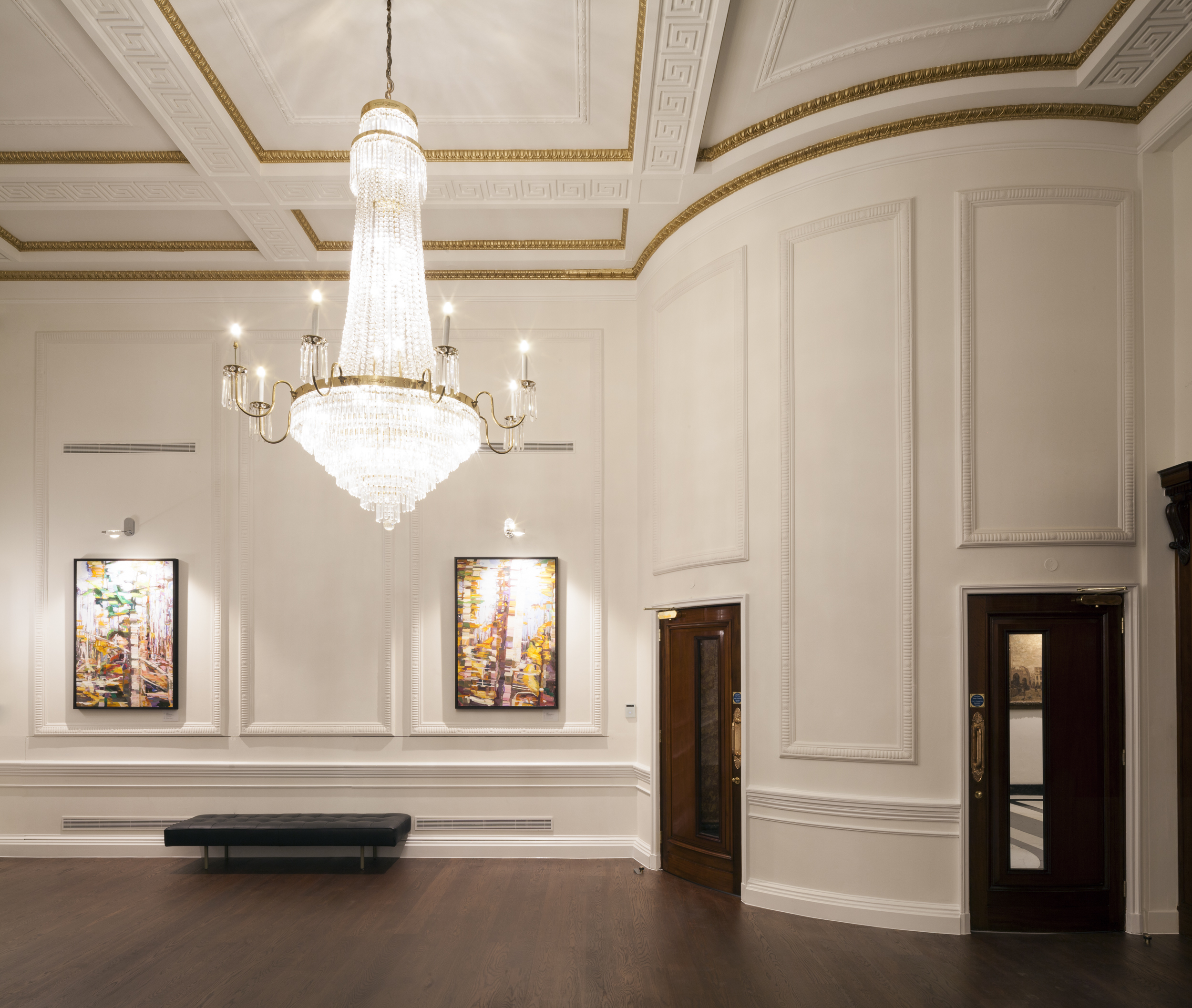
Mackenzie King Room, reception area, Canada House

== Gallery ==
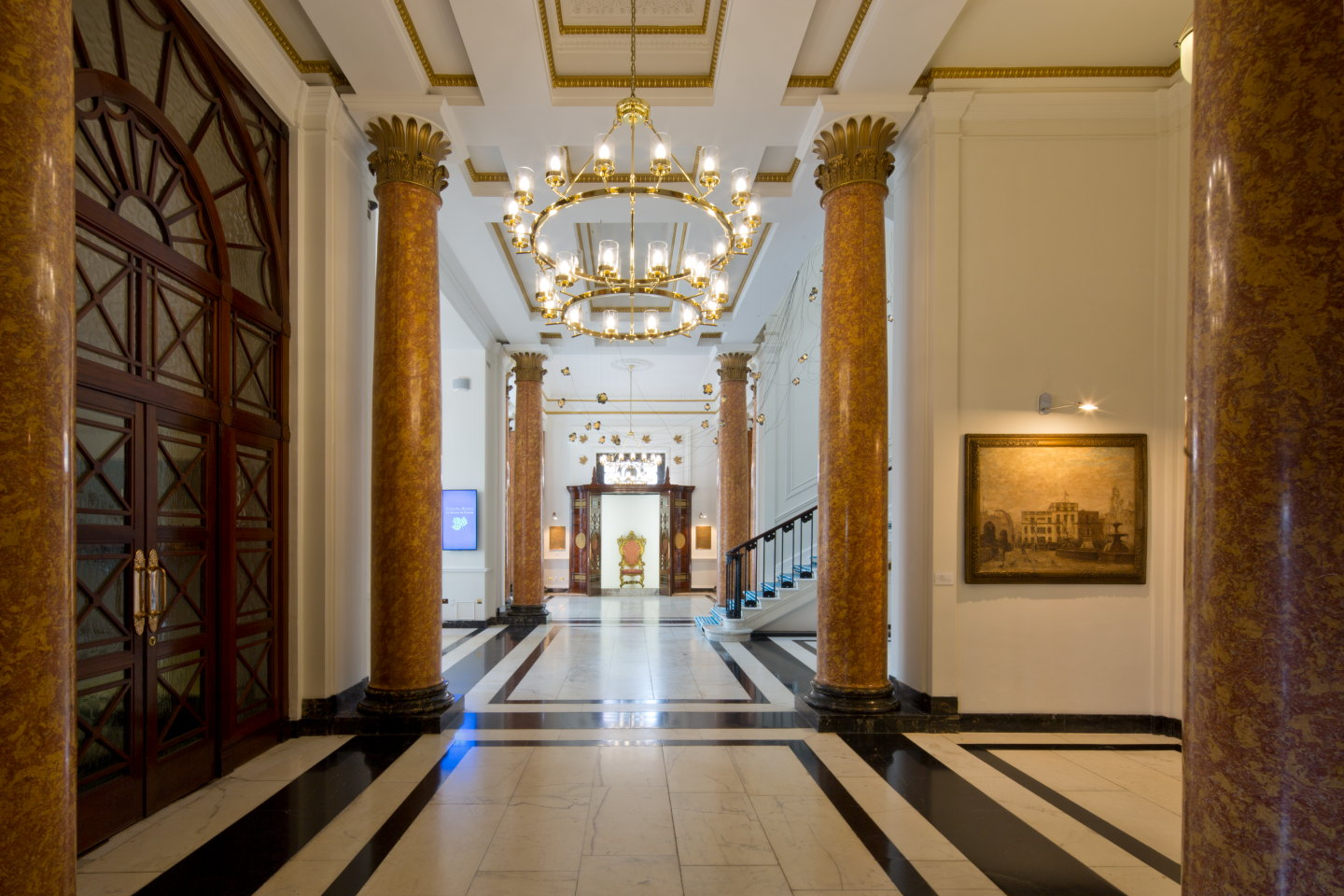
Front entrance of Canada House

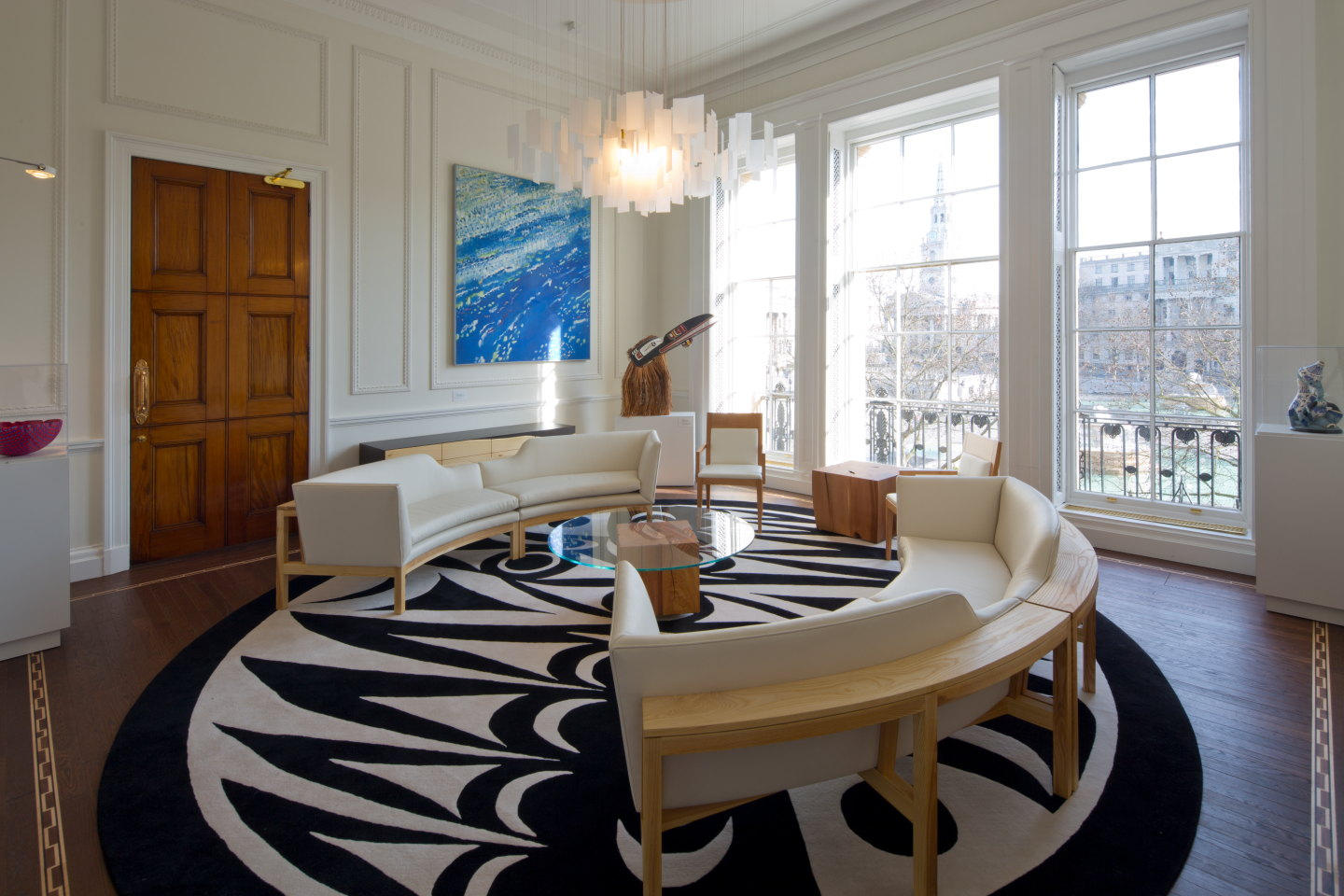
British Columbia Room, Canada House

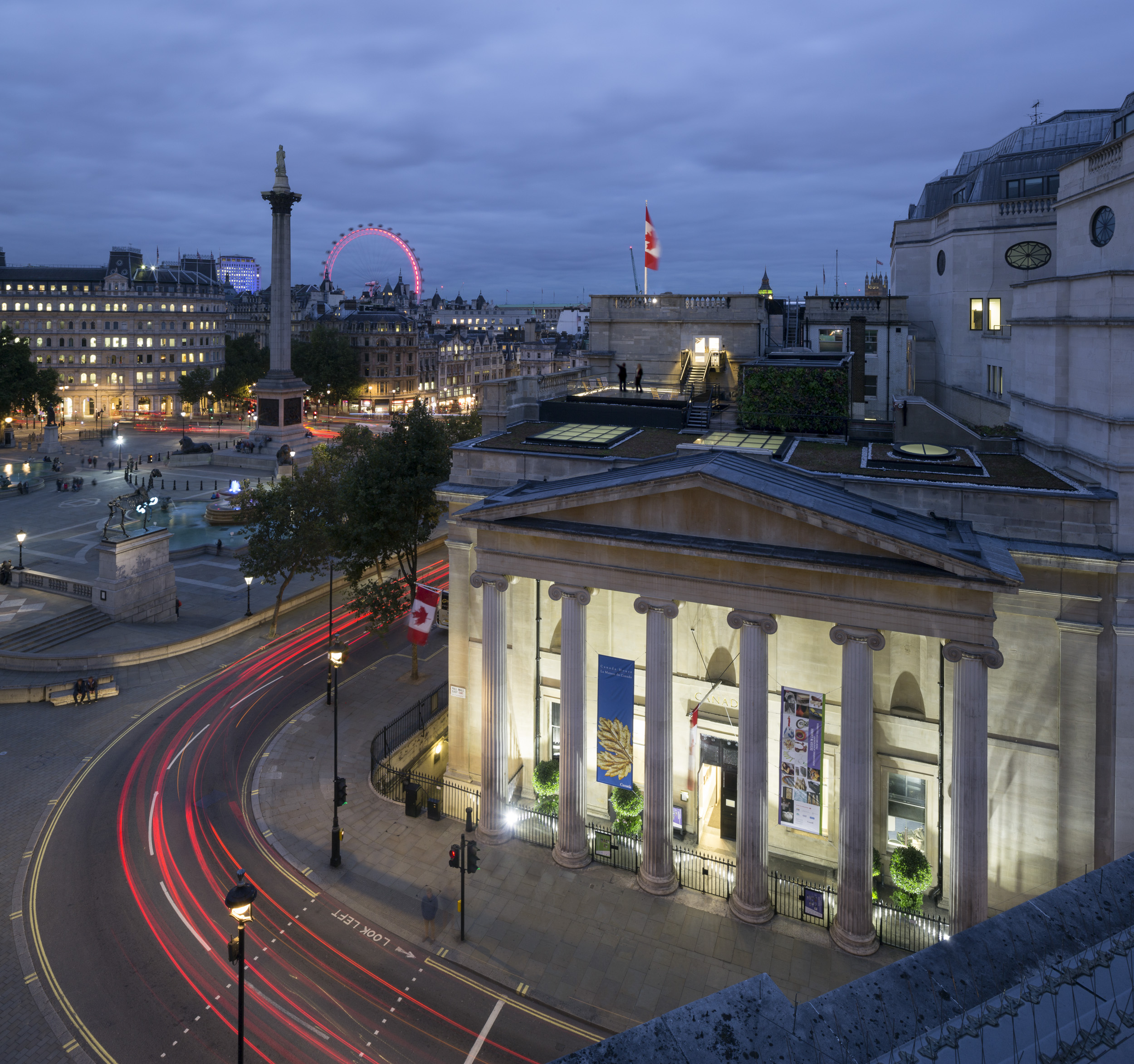
Aerial view of Canada House and Trafalgar Square

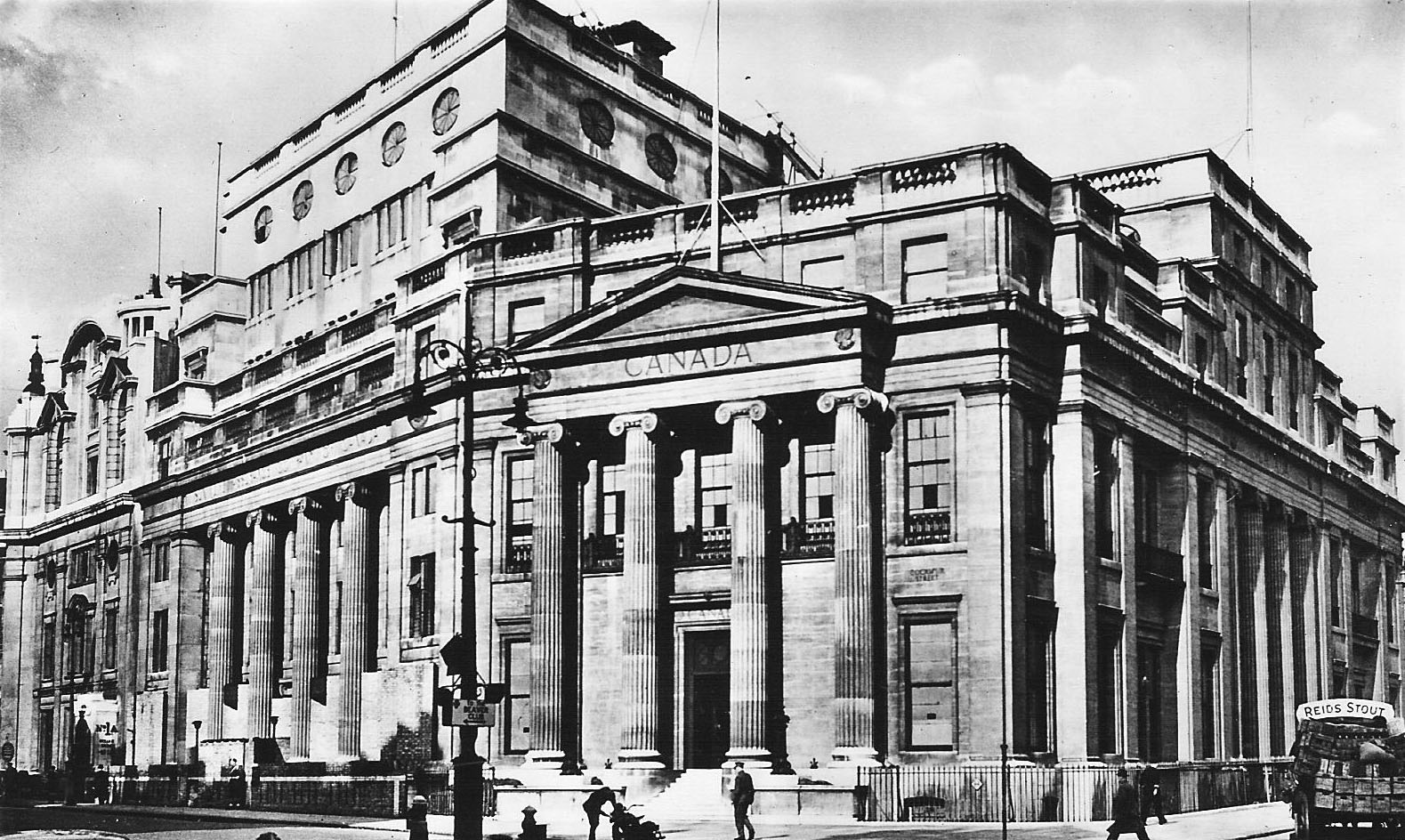
Canada House in 1926

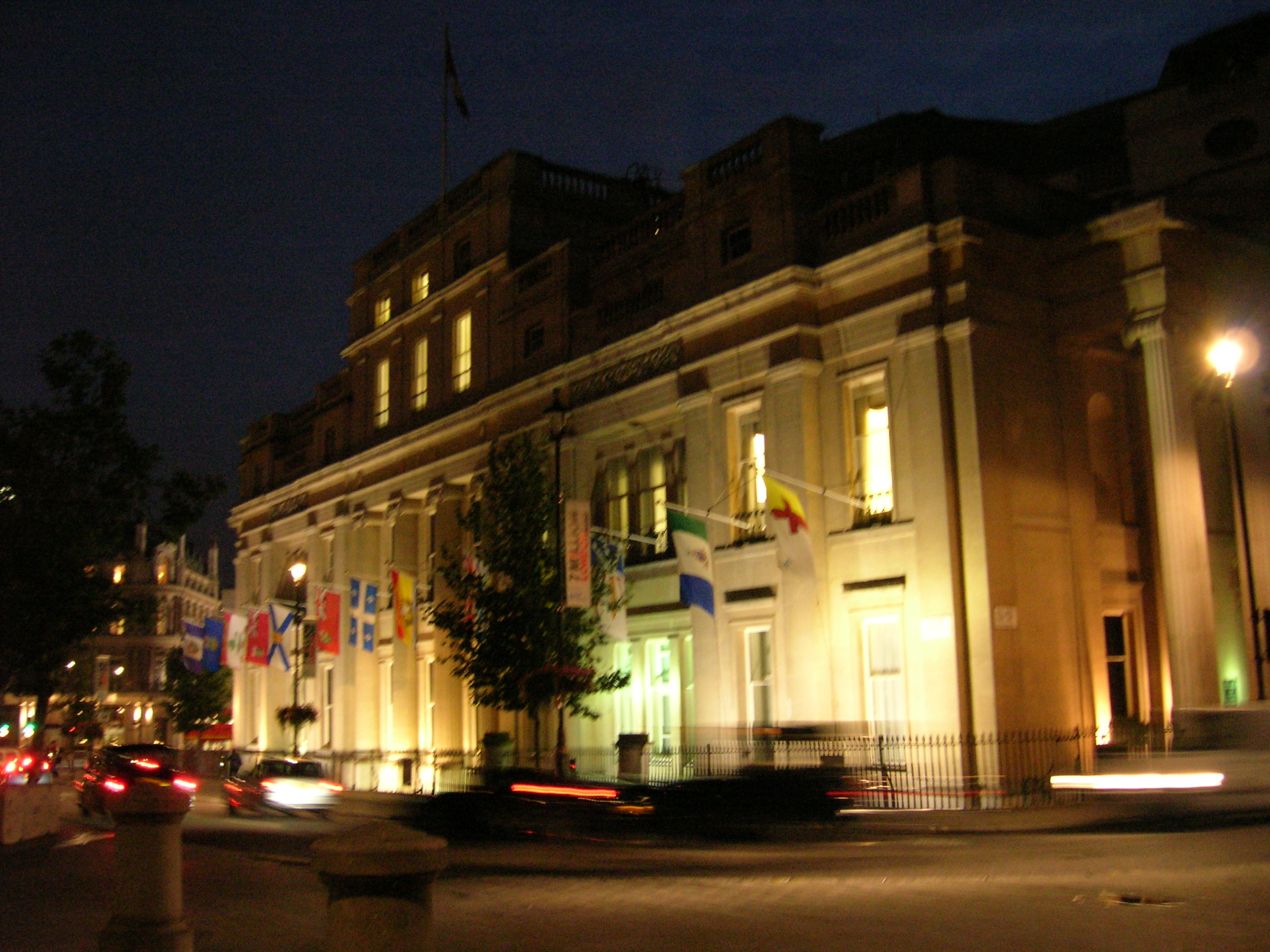
Canada House by night, showing the flags of the provinces and territories of Canada on the side

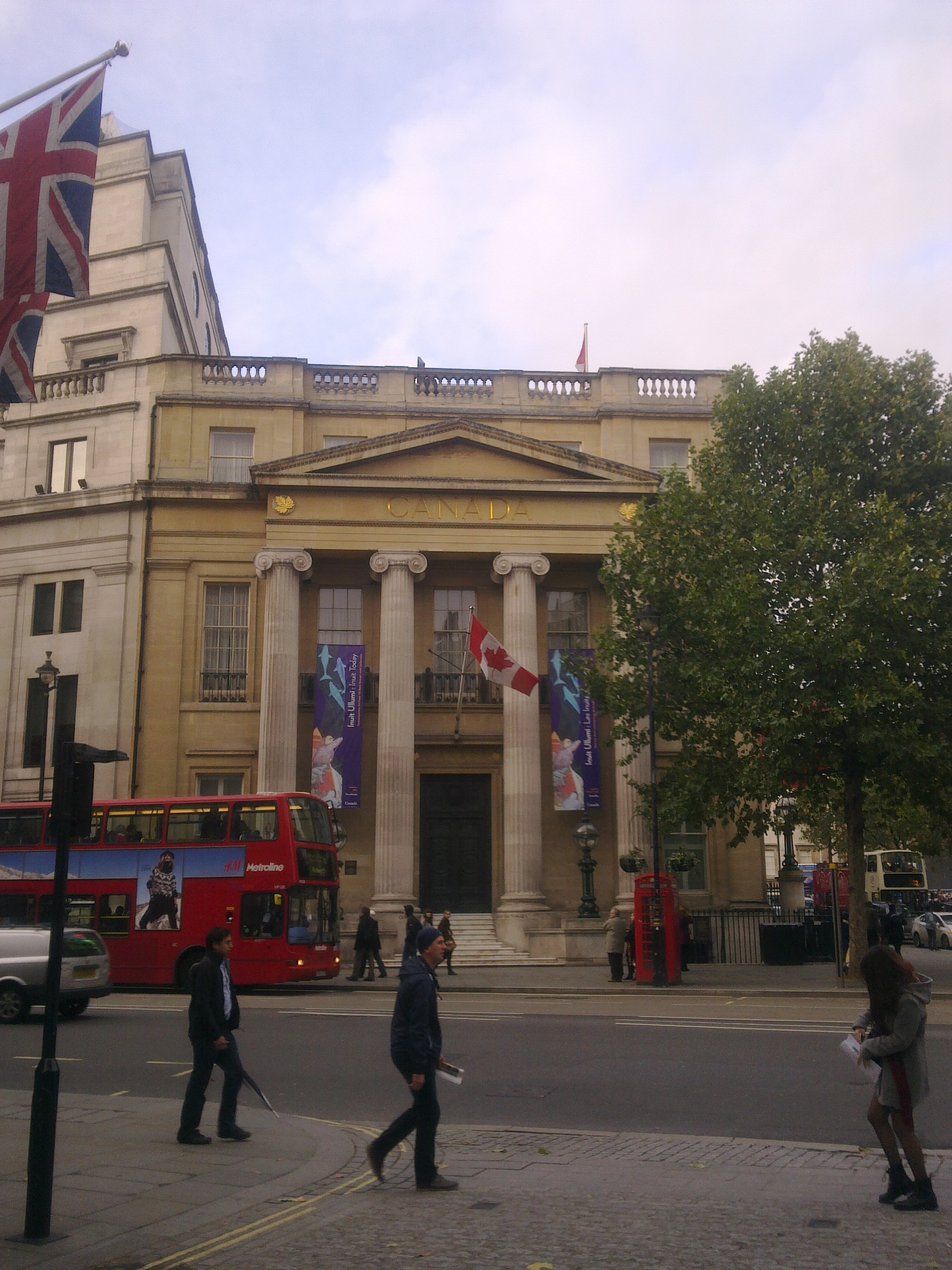
Entrance on Cockspur Street

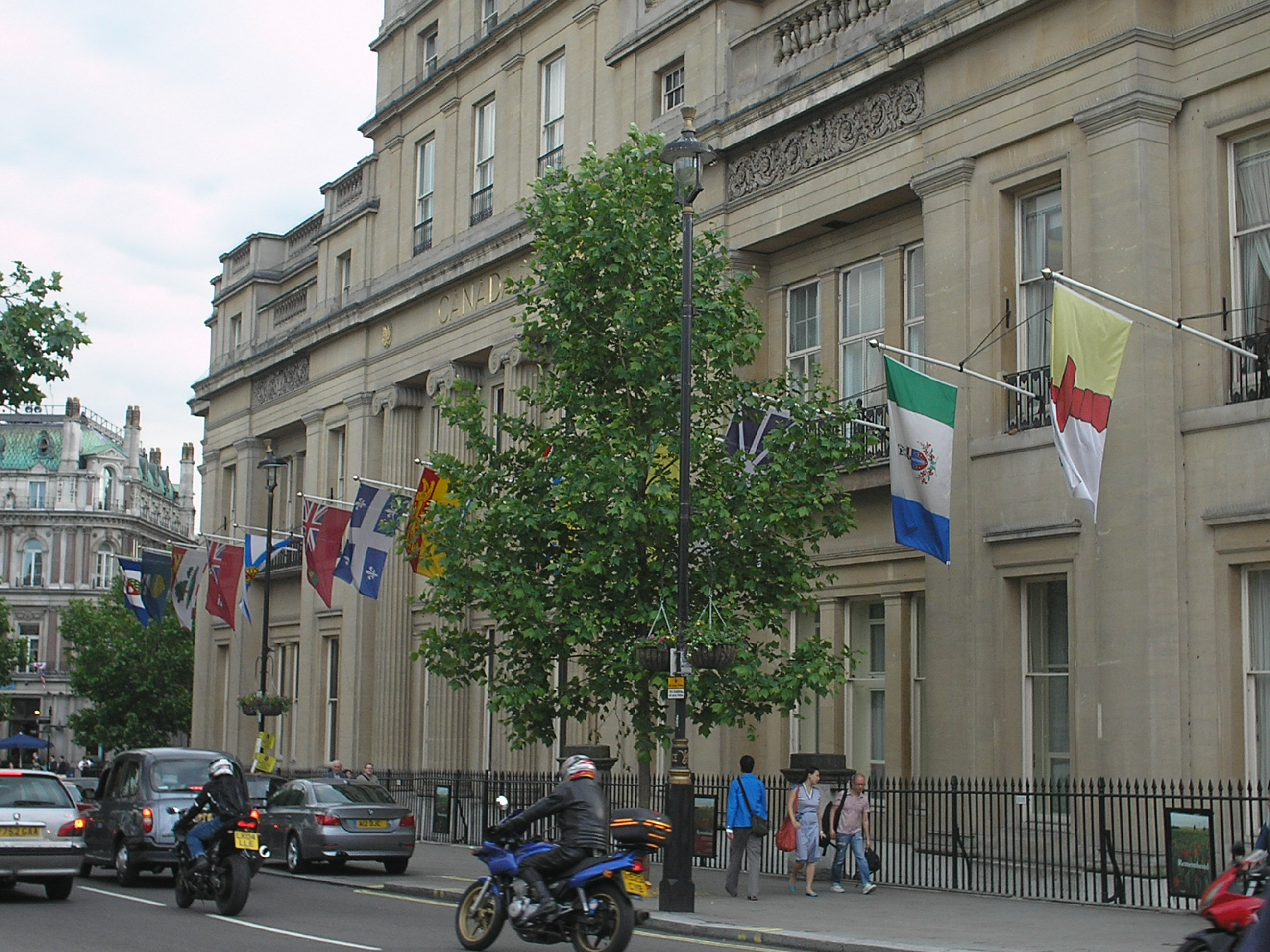
Provincial and territorial flags on Canada House

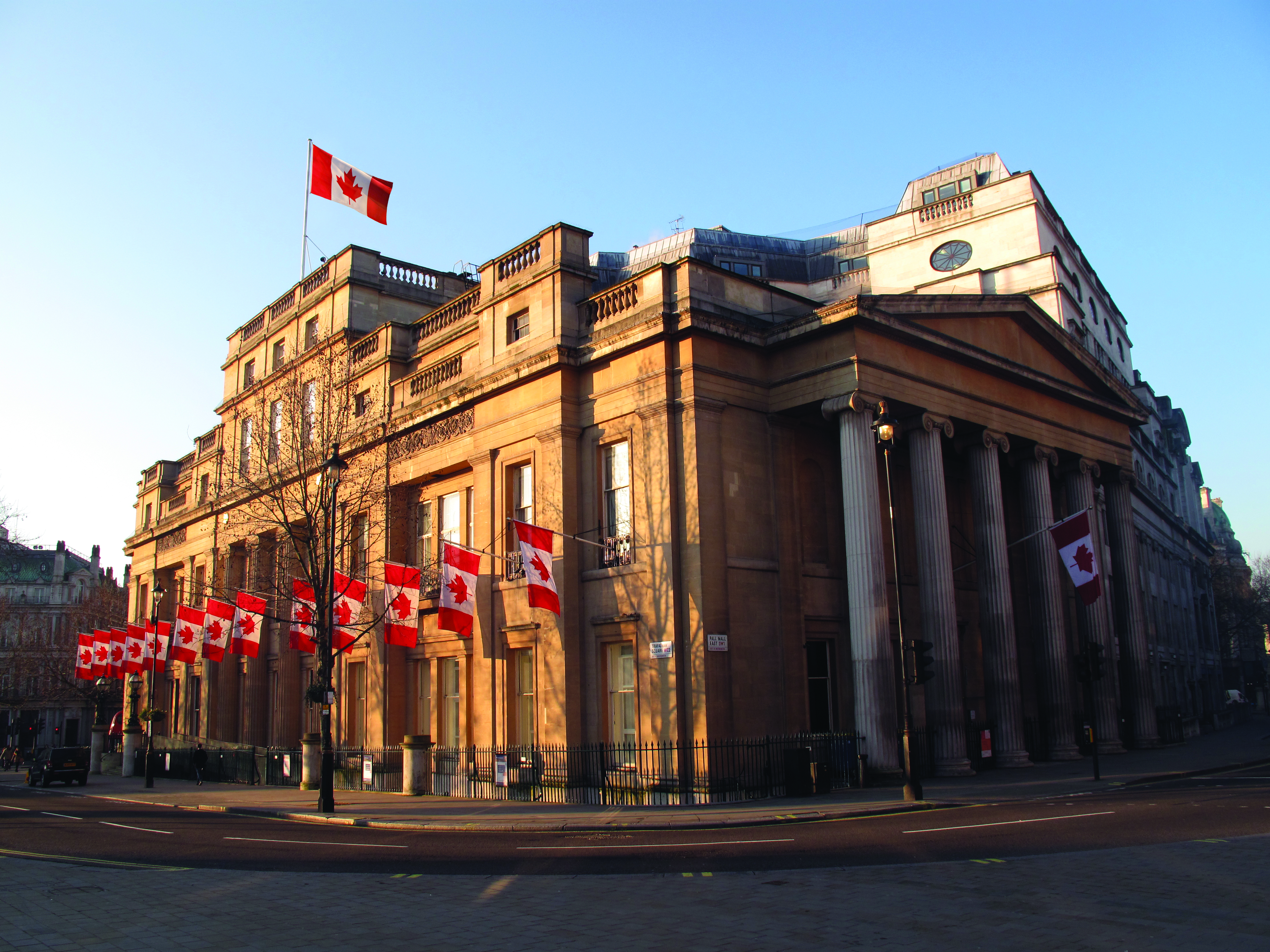
Canada House with flags

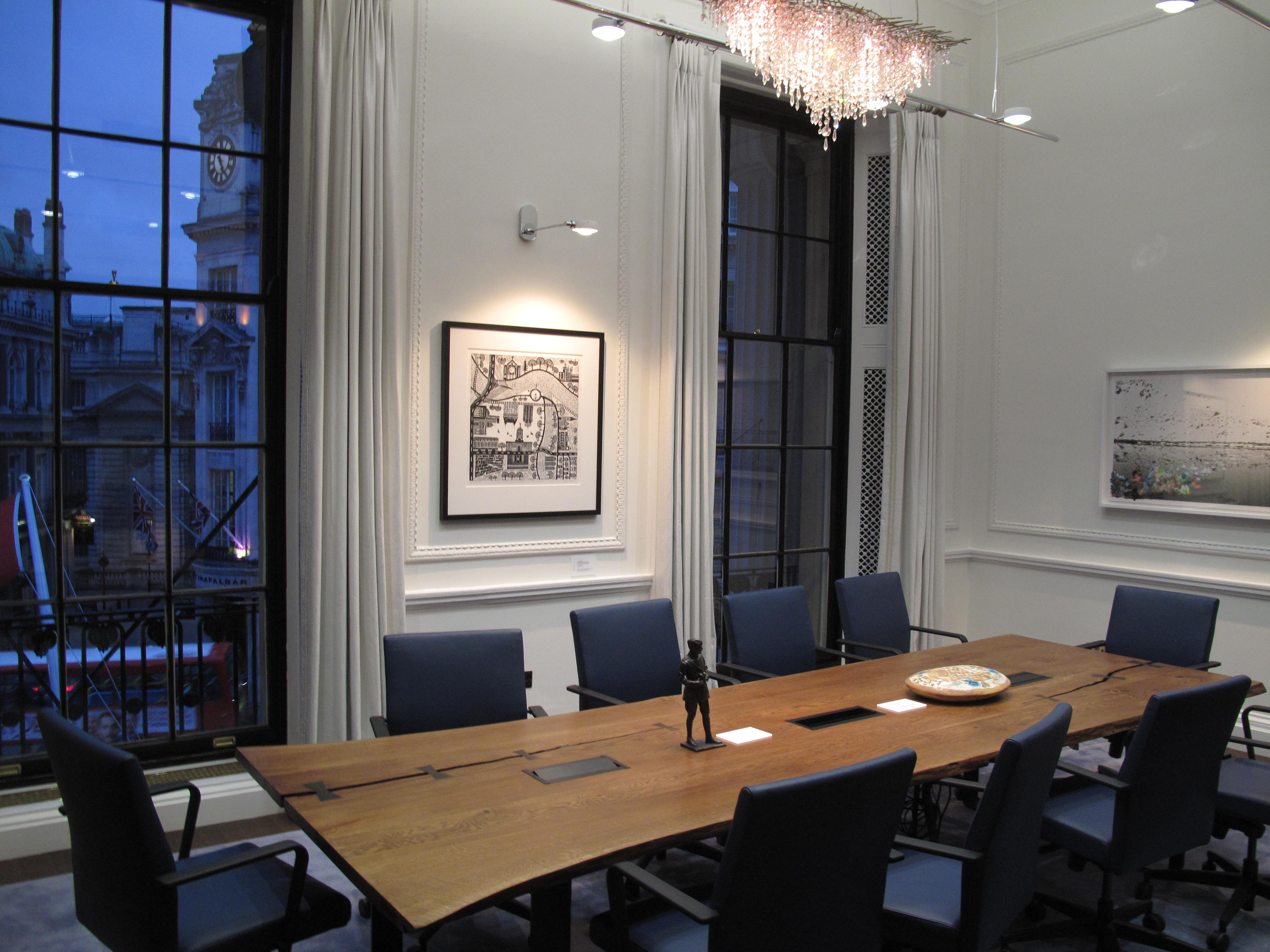
The Manitoba Room in Canada House

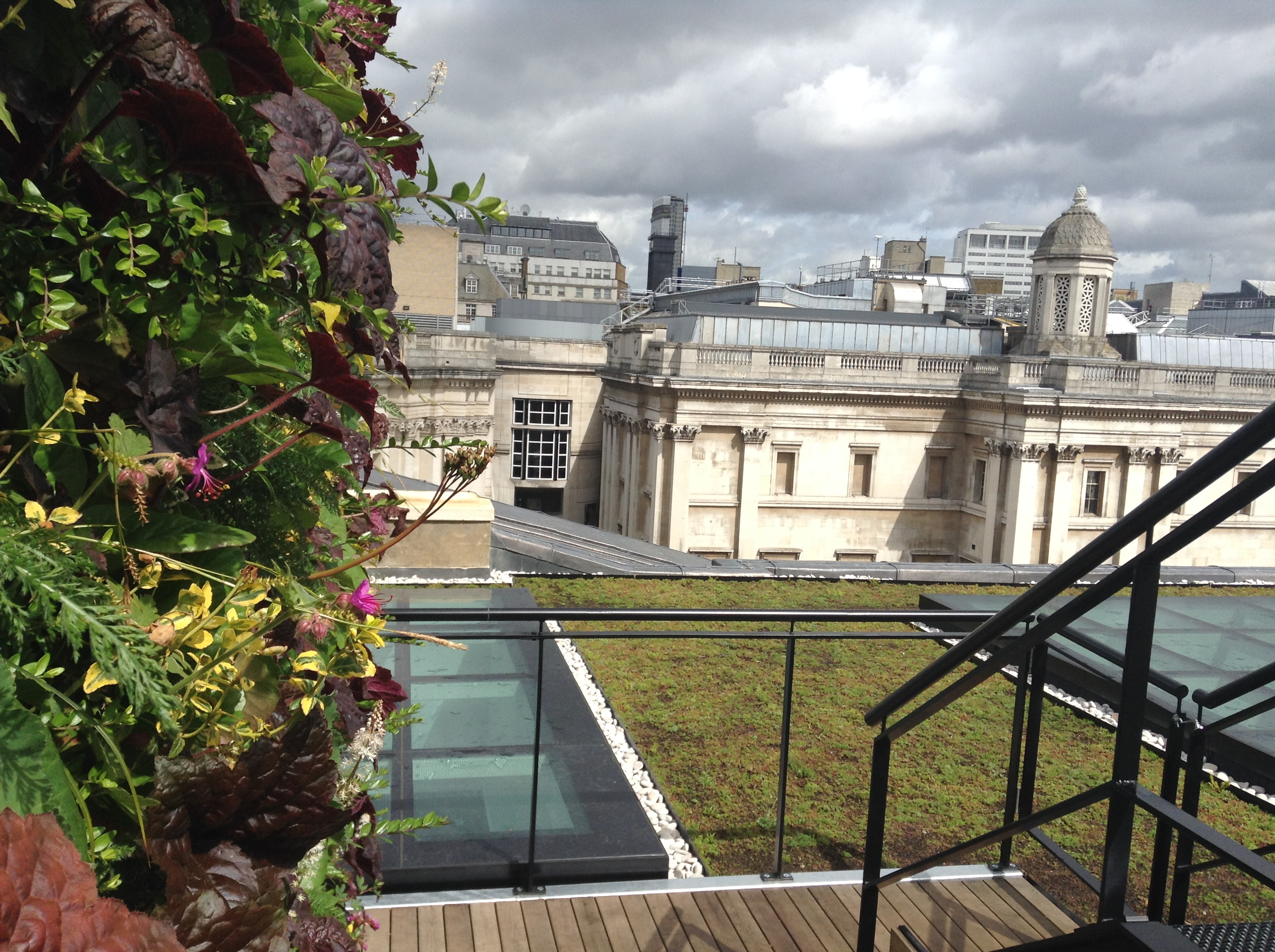
Green roof on top of Canada House

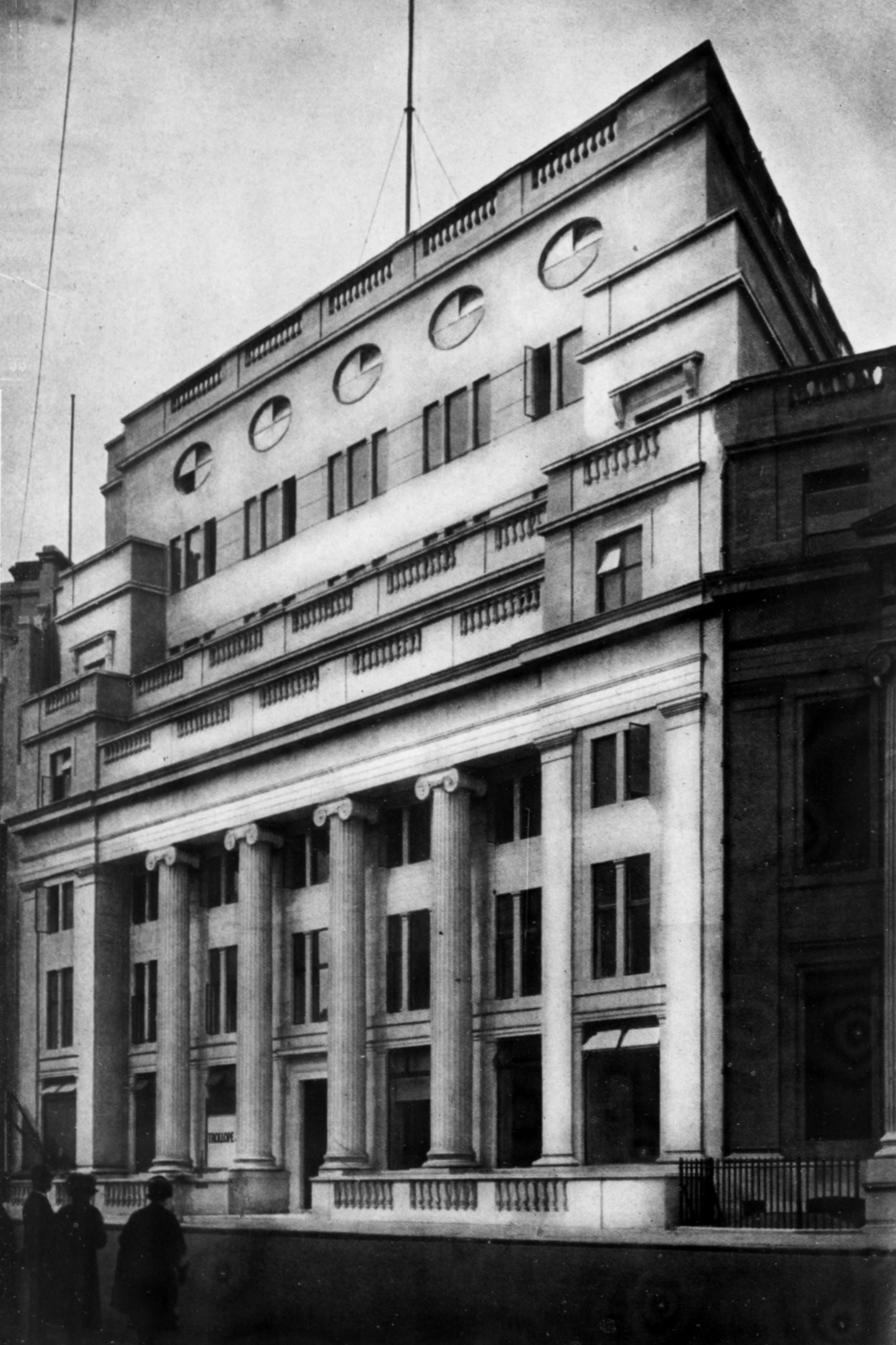
The 1928 Sun Life building at 2-4 Cockspur, designed by Septimus Warwick

== See also ==
- Canada House, Berlin
