= Lambeth Town Hall =

Municipal building in London, England

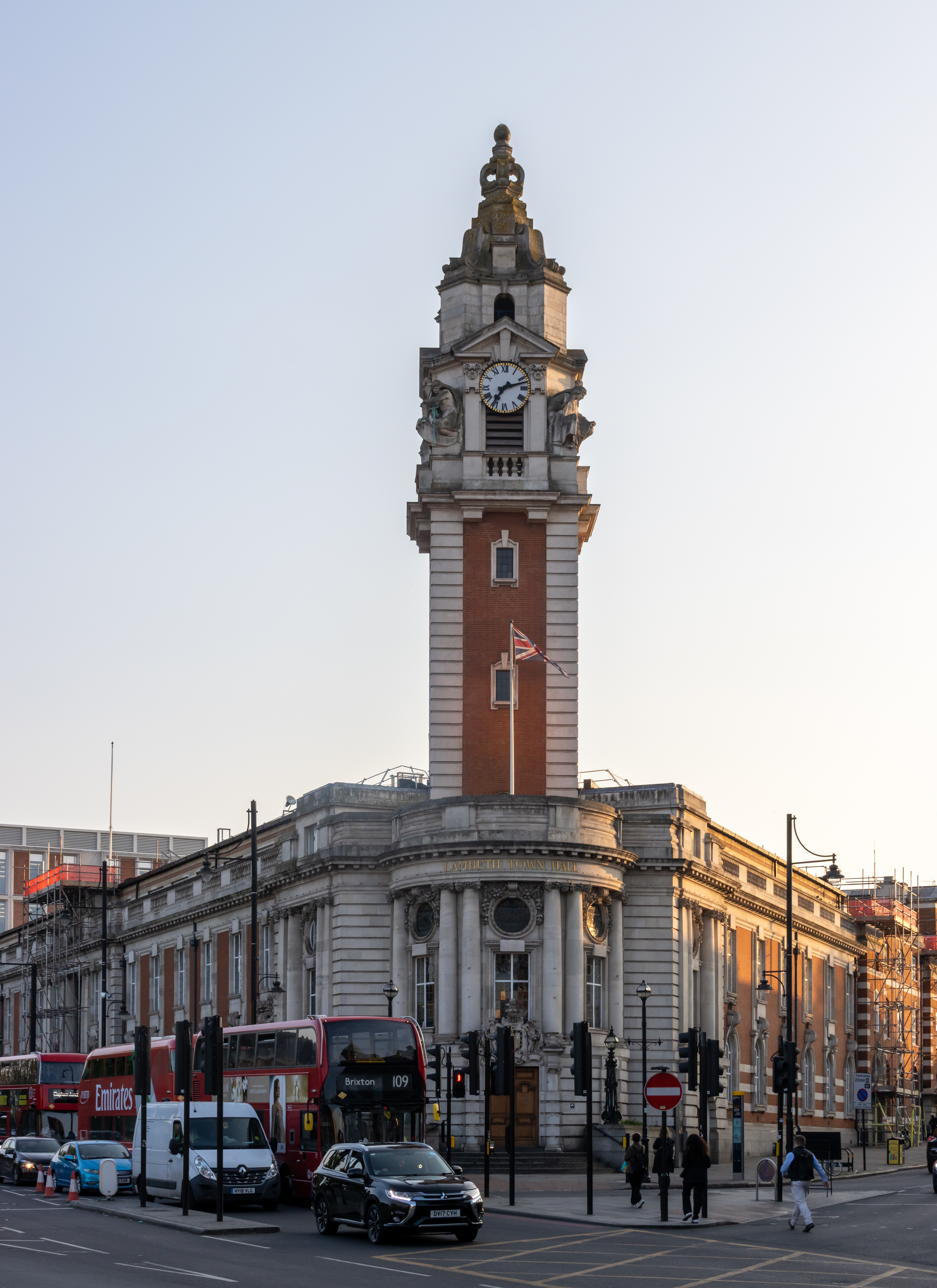
- The Town Hall in 2025

- Shown in Lambeth
- 51.460727°N 0.116521°W
- Location: Brixton Hill, Brixton

History
- Built: 1908

Site notes
- Architect(s): Septimus Warwick and H. Austen Hall
- Architectural style: Edwardian Baroque style

Listed Building – Grade II
- Designated: 27 March 1981
- Reference no.: 1080534

Lambeth Town Hall, also known as Brixton Town Hall, is a municipal building at the corner of Brixton Hill and Acre Lane, Brixton, London. The town hall, which is the headquarters of Lambeth London Borough Council, is a Grade II listed building.

== History ==
The building was commissioned to replace the Old Town Hall in Kennington Road which had been completed in 1853. After the area became a metropolitan borough in 1900, civic leaders decided that the old building was inadequate for their needs and decided to procure a larger building: the site they selected had been occupied by some residential properties.

After a design competition that attracted 143 entries, Septimus Warwick and H. Austen Hall were selected to design the building in Edwardian Baroque style. The foundation stone was laid by the mayor, Frederick Powell, on the 21 July 1906. The building was built by John Greenwood Limited at a cost, excluding furnishings, of £40,000 and it was formally opened by the Prince and Princess of Wales on 29 April 1908.

The building was extended westwards between 1935 and 1938 to sympathetic designs by Whinney, Son and Austen Hall with E.R. Silver, adding an extra floor and creating an assembly hall. In 1964 a plaque was unveiled at the town hall to commemorate the life of Violette Szabo GC, a member of the Special Operations Executive, who had been brought up in Brixton before serving in the Second World War.

The building continued to serve as the headquarters of the Metropolitan Borough of Lambeth for much of the 20th century and continued to be the local seat of government after the formation of the London Borough of Lambeth in 1965.

In June 1998 the former mayor of Southwark, Sam King, led the 50th anniversary celebrations of the docking of the cruise ship HMT Empire Windrush at the Port of Tilbury; a plaque was erected in the town hall to commemorate the event.

As part of a wider regeneration scheme, which included the construction of new residential units and offices, the town hall was the subject of a programme of refurbishment works which were undertaken by Morgan Sindall at a cost of £25 million and completed in 2018. As part of the scheme, most of the council's offices were consolidated into a new building called Lambeth Civic Centre at 6 Brixton Hill, a short distance south of the town hall, which opened in March 2018. Council meetings continue to be held in the town hall.

== Features ==
The building occupies a triangular site, with its longest and principal facades at Brixton Hill and Acre Lane. The design involves a symmetrical rounded frontage at the junction of these two roads; it features a doorway flanked by Doric order pilasters and the borough coat of arms above; there are five tall windows with integrated oculi interspersed with Ionic order columns on the first floor. Above the entrance rises the 134 feet (41 m) high clock tower which is a local landmark. The clock and bells were made by Gillett & Johnston of Croydon; the clock chimes out every 15 minutes. Sculpted stone figures surround the four clock faces, at the corners of the tower, representing Justice, Science, Art and Literature. On the Brixton Road facade near the foundation stone is a stone war memorial with the names of Lambeth Borough Council staff who died in the First World War.

The main external materials are Portland stone, Norwegian granite and red brick. Both the exterior and interior feature many original decorative details such as sculptures, metalwork and stained glass. Interior spaces include the council chamber, meeting rooms, atrium and a community room.
