= Church of the Holy Cross, Sherston =

Church in Wiltshire, England

Coordinates: 51.573°N 2.212°W

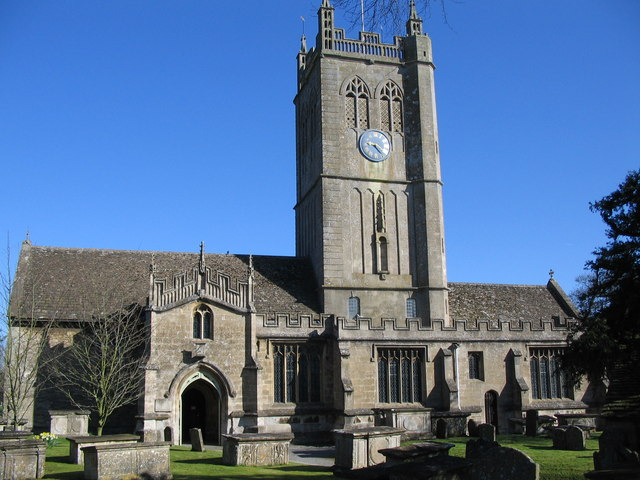
- Church of the Holy Cross, Sherston
- Denomination: Church of England
- Churchmanship: Broad Church

History
- Dedication: The Holy Cross

Administration
- Province: Canterbury
- Diocese: Bristol
- Archdeaconry: Malmesbury
- Deanery: North Wiltshire
- Parish: Sherston

Clergy
- Priest: Rev Susan Harvey

The Church of the Holy Cross is the Grade I listed Anglican parish church in the village of Sherston, Wiltshire, England. It has Norman origins and contains many interesting religious items, including remains of Norman wall decoration, and a crucifix donated to the church by Italian soldiers during World War II.

== History, architecture and fittings ==
The Domesday Book of 1086 recorded a church at Sherston and the present church is probably on the same site, in the centre of the village beyond the north end of the High Street. It has a chancel, a nave with aisles, a crossing tower, north transept and south porch. Nikolaus Pevsner writes: "An impressive church with a crossing tower, almost too high for the rest."

The oldest part of the building is the 12th-century north arcade. The crossing and north transept (with a group of three lancet windows) are early 13th-century, and on the outside of the north transept a number of 12th-century corbels were reused. There is also a standing figure of a saint, from the mid to late 12th century, above the east side of the later south porch. Pevsner describes the crossing arches as "partly resting on big and excellently carved heads". The chancel is late 13th century. In the 15th century most of the windows were renewed, and the two-storey south porch was added.

The tower was rebuilt in 1733 in the Gothic Survival style to designs of Thomas Sumsion of Colerne. Julian Orbach, updating Pevsner, likens the two upper stages to Sumsion's work at Colerne and Dursley, and links the openwork battlements and square pinnacles to Gloucester Cathedral.

Restoration was carried out in 1876–7 by T.H. Wyatt, and there was further work by Ewan Christian later in that century, particularly in the chancel which Pevsner called "drastically restored"; the east window is by Christian.

The restored 13th-century font is a plain octagon on five shafts; the hexagonal pulpit is 17th-century. In the north wall of the north transept is a tomb recess from the mid 13th century, containing an lying effigy of a civilian; another recess in the north aisle is 14th-century. Monuments include in the south aisle a fine 1715 portrayal of Joyce Hitchings as a praying woman, and in the chancel for Anne Hodges (1676) and Thomas Estcourt Cresswell (1788), said by Pevsner to be "an elegant work".

The six bells include two of c.1660 by an unknown maker, and two from the 18th century by Rudhall of Gloucester; there is also a sanctus bell dated 1632. The church was designated as Grade I listed in 1959, and in 1986 the 17th-century lychgate (with pair of 18th-century gates) was listed at Grade II.

== Parish ==
The benefice was united with that of the small neighbouring parish of Easton Grey in 1954. Today the parish is at the centre of the Gauzebrook group of churches, alongside the parishes of eight surrounding villages.
