= Tracklements =

British food company

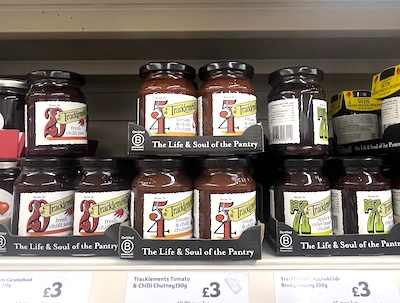
Jars of chutneys made by Tracklements

Tracklements is a British food company based in Malmesbury, Wiltshire that specialises in mustard, chutneys, mint sauce and other sauces.

It was founded by William Tullberg in 1970 and was later managed by his son Guy Tullberg; it was taken over by French food company Charbonneaux-Brabant in 2025 with Guy Tullberg becoming chairman. The name comes from a word for sauces which was popularised or coined by Dorothy Hartley.
