= Septimus Warwick =

British architect

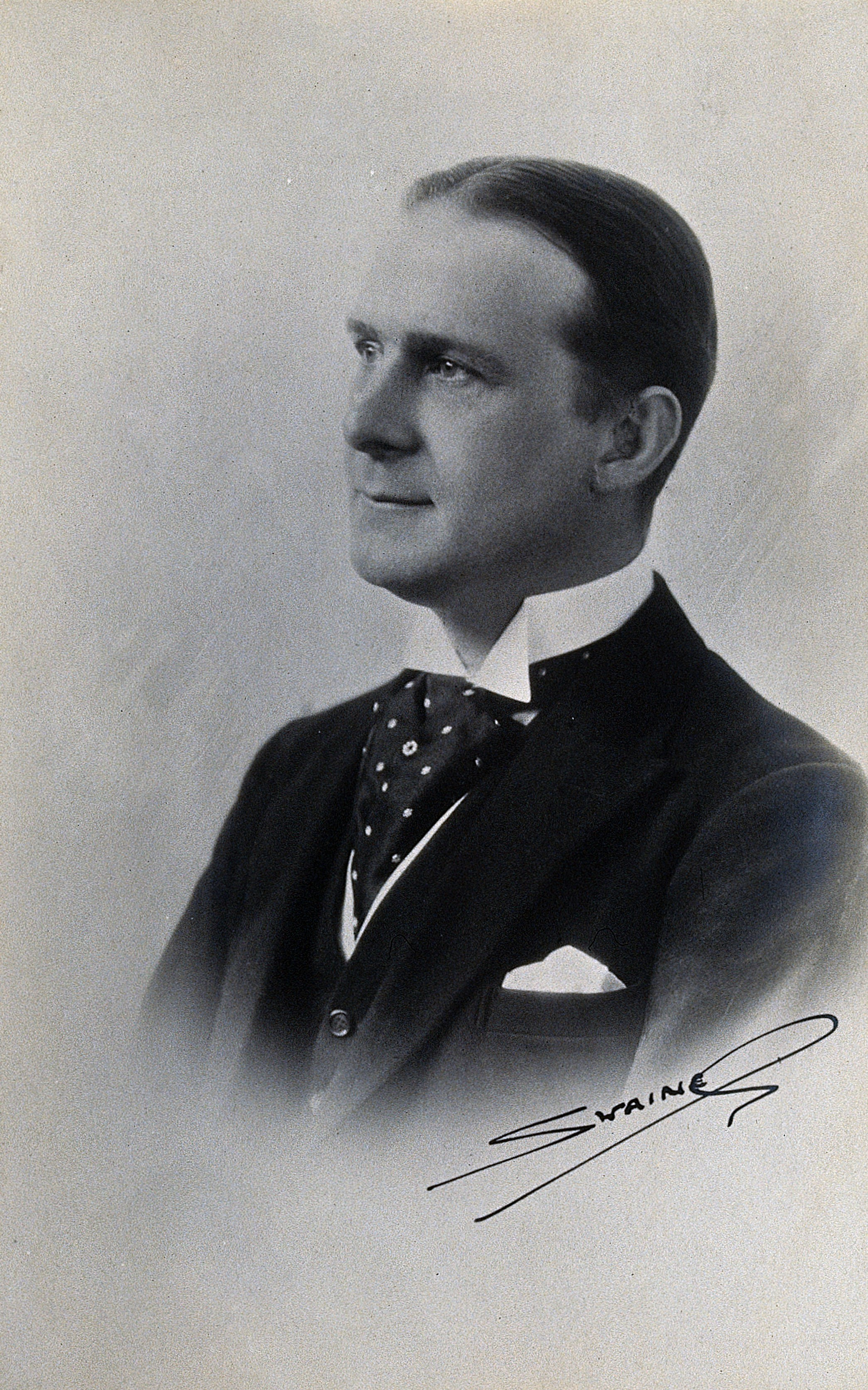
- Portrait by Swaine. Credit: Wellcome Library
- Born: 1881
- Died: October 27, 1953 (aged 71–72); London
- Occupation: Architect
- Buildings: Lambeth Town Hall, Wellcome Library

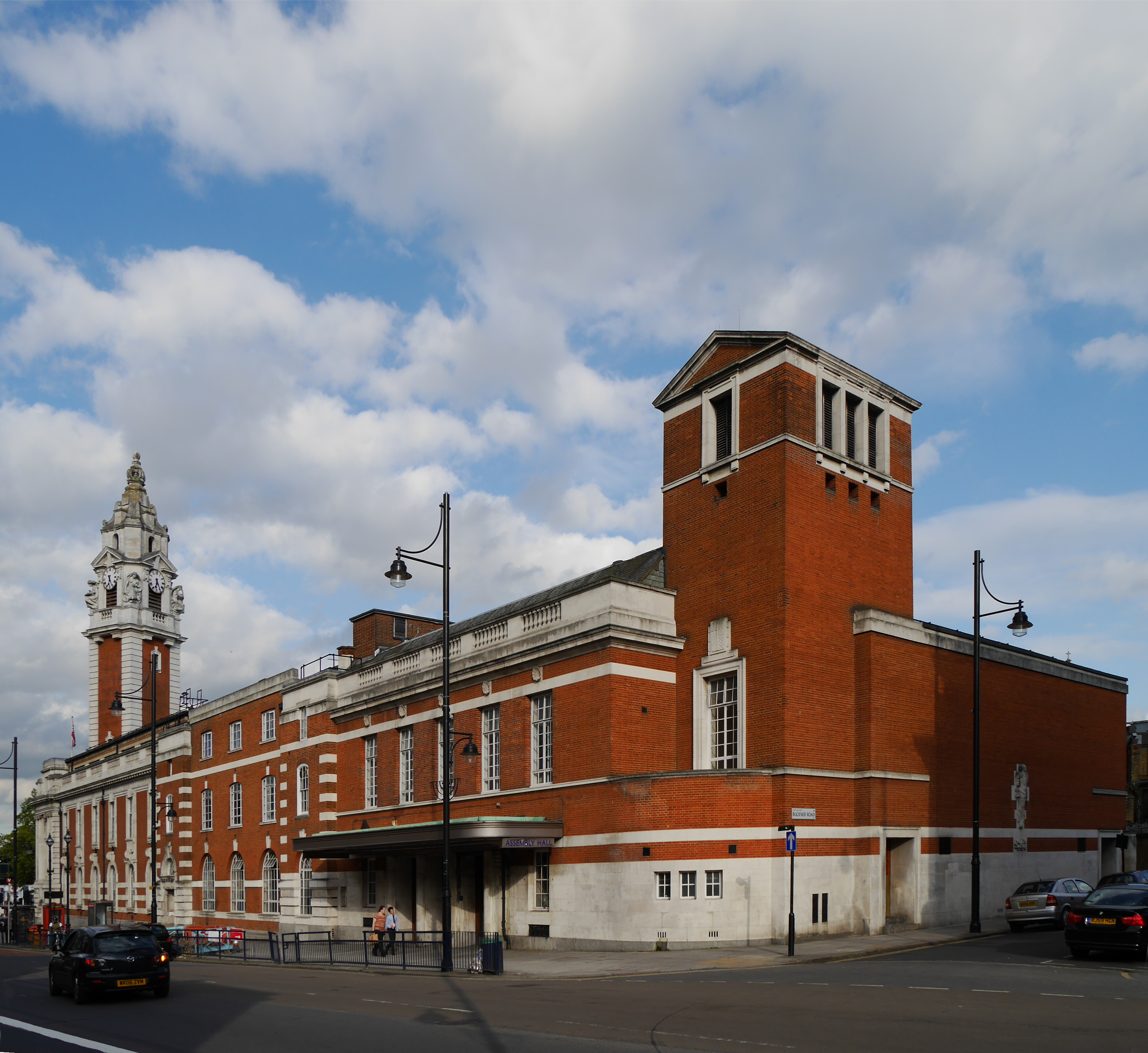
Lambeth Town Hall, 2015

Septimus Warwick (1881-1953) was a British architect who started his career as a designer of town halls in a partnership with H. Austen Hall.

Warwick designed Lambeth Town Hall on Brixton Hill and Acre Lane, Brixton, London SW2, a Grade II listed building, built in 1908. He also designed the Holborn Town Hall (1906) and the Shire Hall in Reading (1909). Warwick moved to Canada in 1913, where he initially worked with Frank Simon on the Legislative Buildings at Winnipeg, Manitoba. Subsequently he designed a number of buildings for clients in Montreal. He returned to England in 1920.

At the end of the twenties, he was contracted by Sir Henry Wellcome to design his new Wellcome Research Institution, now the Wellcome Library on Euston Road.

== Notable buildings ==
- Lambeth Town Hall, London (1908)
- Old Shire Hall, Reading (1911)
- Canada House, London (1925 renovations)
- Wellcome Library
