= Æthelred the Unready =

King of England (978–1013, 1014–1016)

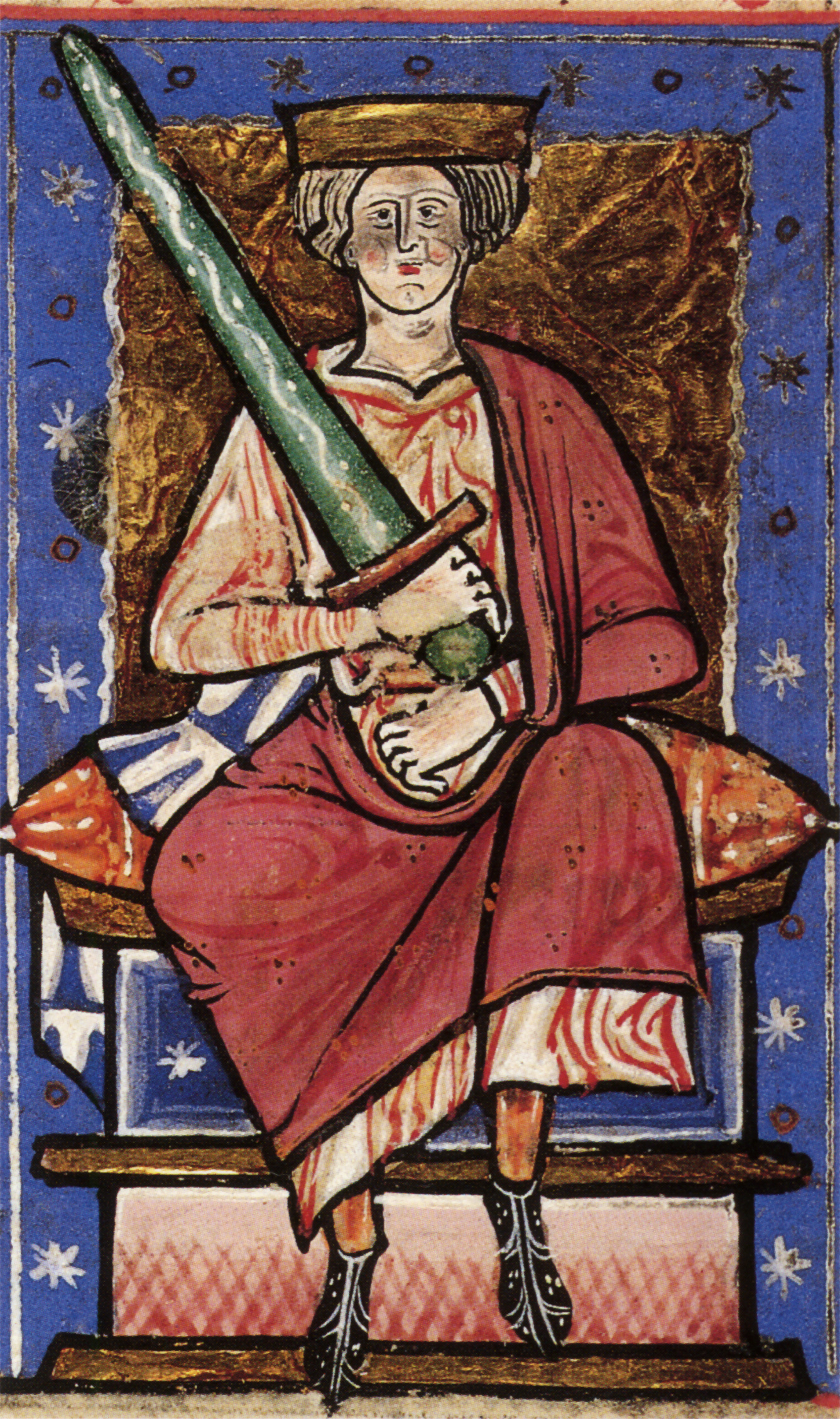
- Æthelred in the Abingdon Chronicle, c. 1220

King of the English
- 1st reign: 18 March 978 – December 1013
- Predecessor: Edward the Martyr
- Successor: Swein Forkbeard
- 2nd reign: February 1014 – 23 April 1016
- Predecessor: Swein Forkbeard
- Successor: Edmund II
- Born: c. 968; England
- Died: 23 April 1016 (aged about 48); London, England
- Burial: Old St Paul's Cathedral, destroyed in the Great Fire of London
- Spouses: Ælfgifu of York?; Emma of Normandy
- Issue Detail: Æthelstan; Ecgberht; Edmund; Eadred; Eadwig; Edgar; Eadgyth; Ælfgifu; Edward; Alfred; Godgifu
- House: Wessex
- Father: Edgar
- Mother: Ælfthryth

Æthelred II (Note: His name is also shown as Aethelred and Ethelred. Old English spellings include Ædelræd, Æðelred and Æþelred. Æthelred I was king of Wessex from 865 to 871.) (c. 968 – 23 April 1016), known as Æthelred the Unready, was King of the English from March 978 to December 1013 and again from February 1014 until his death. The epithet "Unready" or "Unræd" is a pun on his name in Old English, Æðel (noble) and ræd (counsel). He was the son of King Edgar (r. 959–975) and Queen Ælfthryth.

Æthelred was born between 966 and 969, and very little is known of his early life. He came to the throne after the assassination by unknown perpetrators of his older half-brother, King Edward the Martyr (r. 975–978). The crime deeply shocked people, but Æthelred was too young to be suspected of involvement. Shortly after his accession, Viking attacks resumed after a generation of peace. Minor raids in the 980s escalated to large attacks from the 990s. As the English were rarely victorious in battle, the king and his advisers resorted to giving the Vikings tribute to leave England. In 1002, Æthelred ordered the St Brice's Day massacre of Danes, which is seen by historians as a sign of his increasing paranoia, and this culminated by 1009 in the rise of Eadric Streona to become the most powerful of Æthelred's advisers. Increasingly destructive raids by Viking armies wore down English resistance, and in December 1013 King Swein Forkbeard of Denmark conquered England. Æthelred fled to Normandy, but when Swein died in February 1014 he returned to the throne and drove out Swein's son Cnut. In early 1015, civil war broke out when Eadric Streona murdered close allies of Æthelred's oldest surviving son, Edmund Ironside. Cnut returned soon afterwards and Edmund and Æthelred tried to unite against him, but suspicion between father and son hampered them, as did Eadric's treachery and Æthelred's poor health. Æthelred died in April 1016 and Edmund carried on the war until he died in December and Cnut became the king of all England.

Æthelred was only nine to twelve years old when he became king, and during his minority the country was governed by his father's leading advisers, including his mother. When he came of age in the mid-980s, he rejected these advisers and adopted new ones, who persuaded him to grant them property at the expense of the church. By the early 990s he had come to regret the course he had followed and to see the Viking raids as God's punishment for his persecution of the church. The 990s and early 1000s formed the most successful period of his reign, when his advisers were of high calibre and there were major cultural achievements in Latin and Old English literature. Historians writing after the Norman Conquest saw him as a bad king until the late twentieth century, when a new generation reassessed his record and argued that although his reign ended catastrophically, there were significant achievements in the 990s and early 1000s.

== Background ==
In the ninth century, Anglo-Saxon England came under increasing attack from Vikings, beginning with raids and culminating in an invasion by the Great Heathen Army in 865. By 878, the Vikings had overrun the kingdoms of Northumbria, East Anglia, and Mercia, and nearly conquered Wessex, but in that year the West Saxons achieved a decisive victory at the Battle of Edington under King Alfred the Great (r. 871–899). Over the next fifty years, the West Saxons and Mercians gradually conquered the Viking-ruled areas, and in 927 Alfred's grandson Æthelstan (r. 924–939) became the first king of all England when he conquered Northumbria. He was succeeded by his half-brother and Æthelred's grandfather, Edmund (r. 939–946), who almost immediately lost control of the north to the Vikings, but recovered full control of England by 944. He was killed in a brawl with an outlaw, and as his sons Eadwig and Edgar were infants, their uncle Eadred (r. 946–955) became king. Like Edmund, Eadred inherited the kingship of the whole of England yet soon lost it when the magnates of York (southern Northumbria) accepted a Viking king, but he recovered it when they expelled King Erik Bloodaxe in 954.

Eadred's key advisers included Dunstan, Abbot of Glastonbury and future Archbishop of Canterbury. Eadred, who suffered from ill health, was in his early thirties when he died, and Eadwig (r. 955–959) succeeded at the age of around fifteen. He was the first king since the early ninth century not to face the threat of imminent foreign invasion, and England remained free from Viking attacks until early in Æthelred's reign. Eadwig died four years later, and was succeeded by Æthelred's father Edgar (r. 959–975). Eadwig had appointed Ælfhere to be ealdorman of Mercia, and he became the premier layman, a status he retained until his death in 983. His rise was at the expense of the family of the East Anglian magnates, and his rivalry with Æthelwine, Ealdorman of East Anglia, disrupted the country after Edgar's death.

The monastic Benedictine reform movement reached its peak in Edgar's reign under the leadership of Dunstan, Oswald, Archbishop of York, and Æthelwold, Bishop of Winchester. It became a powerful force with strong support from Edgar, earning him high praise by monastic writers. He was a strong, indeed overbearing ruler, and he enriched Benedictine monasteries by forcing lay landowners and secular (non-monastic) religious institutions to give up land to them. Æthelwold was the most active and ruthless of the Benedictine leaders in securing land to support his monasteries, in some cases driving out secular clergy in favour of monks.

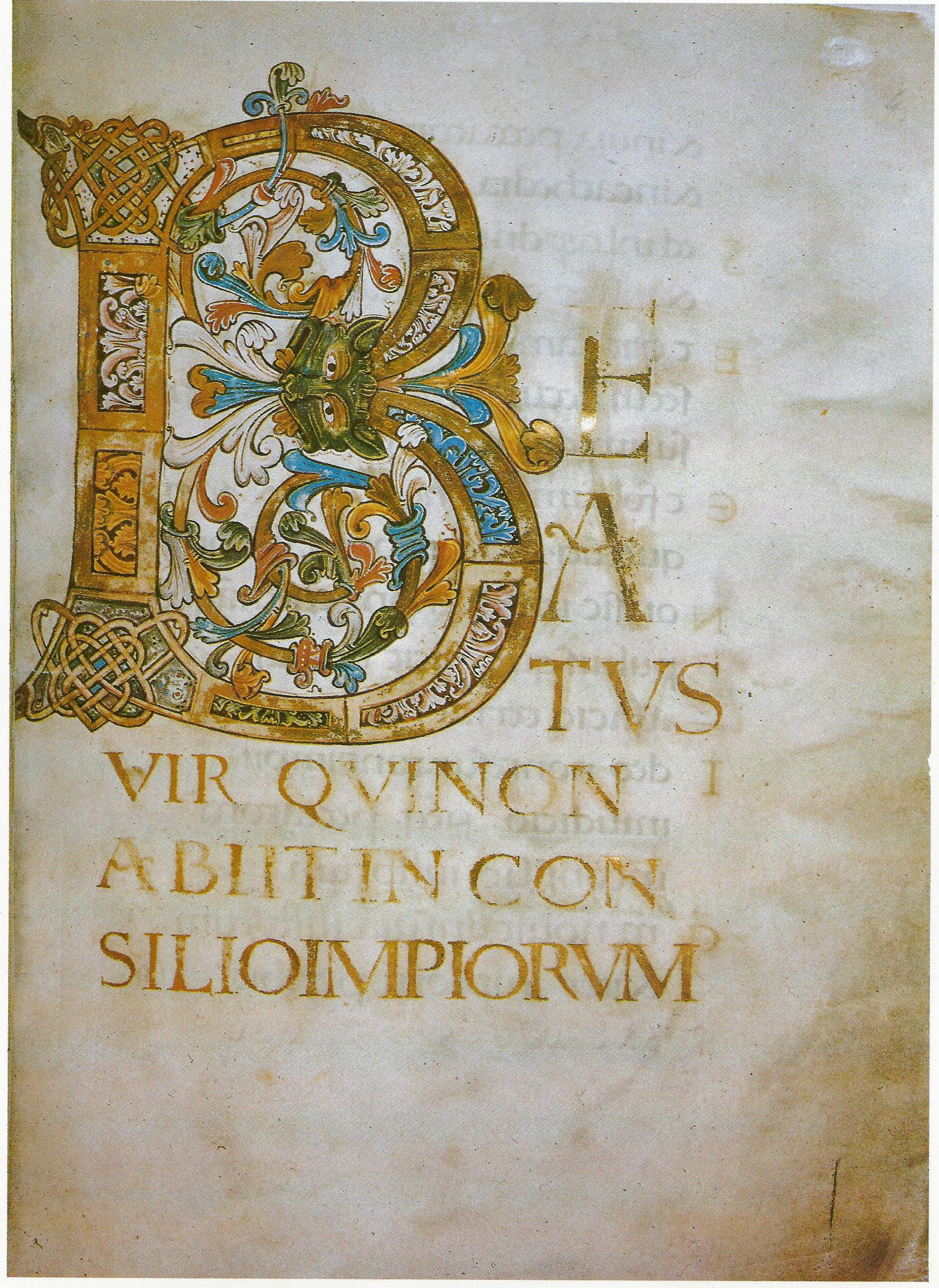
Illustration in the late tenth-century Ramsey Psalter, probably for Ramsey Abbey or Oswald, Archbishop of York

== Name ==
The elements in Æthelred's name in Old English are Æthel (noble) and ræd (counsel). His byname unræd is described by the historian Levi Roach as "his immortal epithet", a pun which changed his name from "good counsel" to "ill counsel". The term is not recorded in the Anglo-Saxon period or by Anglo-Norman historians, and is first recorded in the early thirteenth century. The noun unræd fell into disuse in the later Middle Ages and the epithet changed to the adjective unredi, which led to his being called "Æthelred the Unready".

== Childhood ==
Æthelred was the younger son of King Edgar and Ælfthryth. She was the daughter of Ordgar, ealdorman of Devon, and widow of Æthelwold, Ealdorman of East Anglia, who died in 962. Edgar and Ælfthryth married in 964. Very little is known of Æthelred's early life, not even when he was born. The royal family attested the New Minster Charter in 966, including Æthelred's elder brother Edmund, but not Æthelred, and so he cannot have been born then. This is confirmed by a will in the same year or soon afterwards, which made a bequest to an unnamed ætheling (son of a king), and did not mention any other king's son. Both sons are listed in a genealogical tract of 969, and so Æthelred was born between 966 and 969. Edmund died in 971, but Æthelred also had an elder half-brother, the future King Edward the Martyr. The medievalist Cyril Hart describes Edward as "of doubtful legitimacy", but most historians think that his mother Æthelflæd was a wife of Edgar. She was the first of Edgar's three consorts, and she was followed by Wulfthryth, by whom he had a daughter Edith, who was venerated as a saint after her death in her early twenties.

There is evidence that Ælfthryth's sons may have ranked above their elder half-brother, but it is controversial. Edmund is described in attestations to the New Minster Charter as legitimus prefati regis filius (legitimate son of the aforementioned king), and listed above Edward, who is eodem rege ... procreatus (begotten by the same king). Ælfthryth is legitima prefati regis coniunx (legitimate wife of the king). The cross next to Edward's name is the only one for the royal family not filled in with gold. However, historians think that the charter (grant of land or privileges by the king) was drawn up by Æthelwold, who was a close ally of Ælfthryth. The historian Barbara Yorke sees the denial of Edward's legitimacy as "opportunist special pleading" by Æthelwold. Dunstan appears to have been one of Edward's supporters, and a genealogy created at his Glastonbury Abbey in 969 gives Edward precedence over Edmund and Æthelred.

Æthelred's father, King Edgar, was only thirty-two when he died in July 975, and his death was probably unexpected. The succession to the throne was disputed. Both Æthelred and Edward were probably too young to play an active role in the contest, and were figureheads for the opposing factions. Æthelred's cause was led by his mother, and his supporters included Bishop Æthelwold and Ælfhere of Mercia, while Edward's claim was defended by Dunstan, Æthelwine of East Anglia, and Byrhtnoth, Ealdorman of Essex. In the view of the historian Sean Miller, the cause of the dispute probably lay in rival family alliances rather than which candidate had the best claim to the throne, but Frank Stenton suggests that opposition to Edward, a youth given to frequent outbursts of rage, was probably partly because he "offended many important persons by his intolerable violence of speech and behaviour." The two sides quickly agreed that Edward would be king, while Æthelred received all the lands which were allocated to æthelings, including some which had been granted by Edgar to Abingdon Abbey, and which were taken back by force. When he became king, Æthelred retained the æthelings' lands and also acquired those allocated to the king.

Edward's three-year reign was a period of political turmoil. The nobility seized the opportunity given by Edgar's death to recover their lost estates. The conflict was seen in the past by historians as a dispute between supporters and opponents of the monasteries, but this is no longer widely accepted. According to Hart: "The presence of supporters of church reform in both factions indicates that the conflict between them depended as much on issues of land ownership and local power as on ecclesiastical legitimacy. Adherents of both Edward and Æthelred can be seen appropriating, or recovering, monastic lands". Rivalries and conflicts between different factions of the aristocracy were also important causes of instability. Ælfthryth and Æthelred maintained their alliance with Æthelwold during Edward's reign, and they visited Ely Abbey, which had been refounded by Æthelwold. They were probably both personae non gratae at Edward's court.

== Death of King Edward the Martyr ==
Edward was killed on his arrival to visit Ælfthryth and Æthelred at Corfe in Dorset on 18 March 978. The monastic hagiographer Byrhtferth gives an account of Edward's death in his Life of St Oswald, written around 1000. He wrote that Edward came "seeking the consolations of brotherly love", and was murdered on his arrival by Æthelred's thegns. Edward's thegns took his body to the house of a churl, and the next day he was buried. A year later, Ealdorman Ælfhere came with a great train and had Edward's body exhumed and taken away for honourable burial. Manuscript D of the Anglo-Saxon Chronicle (ASC D), (Note: The Anglo-Saxon Chronicle, often abbreviated as the Chronicle or ASC, is a term used by modern scholars to describe a set of annals which are the most important source for Anglo-Saxon history. The lost original compilation, known as the 'common stock', was written in the late ninth century, probably at the court of Alfred the Great. This has been added to in the various later recensions, known as ASC A to ASC F. These are usually presented as detached reporting, but reflect their authors' locations, political views and interests.) which dates to the second half of the eleventh century or the early twelfth, states that Edward was initially buried at Wareham and translated in the following year by Ælfhere to Shaftesbury.

Post-Conquest chroniclers and some modern historians blame Ælfthryth for Edward's death, but other historians are sceptical. No one was punished for the murder, and no perpetrator is named in pre-Conquest sources. Roach comments that contemporaries seem to have been as uncertain as modern historians who was responsible. Some historians think that Æthelred's partisans killed Edward in the hope of personal advantage, but Ann Williams suggests in her biography of Æthelred that Edward's death may have been the accidental result of an affray between the violent and unstable young king and one or more of the noblemen attendant on Æthelred.

== Reign ==
=== Æthelred's early reign ===
The manner of Edward's death deeply troubled contemporaries. Roach comments: "Medieval kings were felt to be touched by divinity; not only had they been chosen by God, but like bishops they were anointed into their office with holy oil ... To kill a king was, therefore, more than a crime – it was a sin of the first order." Æthelred was too young to have been involved in the murder, but he may have started his reign in a weak position both as its beneficiary and because he was at most twelve years old. It was over a year before he was crowned, and some historians see this as evidence of resistance among the magnates to his succession, but others argue that a long interval between accession and coronation was normal. According to ASC D, "he was consecrated king at Kingston with much rejoicing by the councillors of the English people". Byrhtferth states that "there was great joy at his consecration" and describes the king as "a young man in respect of years, elegant in his manners, with an attractive face and handsome appearance". Williams sees these descriptions as reflecting "relief at a crisis passed".

The most influential magnates during Æthelred's minority had previously been his father's leading counsellors. Ælfthryth, Æthelwold and Ælfhere, who had been Æthelred's chief supporters in the succession dispute when Edgar died, now acted as his regents, while Edward's chief supporters also attested Æthelred's early charters and the attacks on the monasteries were halted, suggesting a successful effort to restore unity in the ruling elite. Ælfthryth became even more powerful as a mother than she had been as a wife, and she often attested Æthelred's early charters immediately after the king, whereas in her husband's reign she had witnessed after the archbishops and bishops.

After the death of Æthelwold in August 984, Æthelred dismissed his regents, including Ælfthryth, who did not attest his charters between August 984 and the summer of 993. The historian George Molyneaux observes that "Æthelwold's power had been such that only his death enabled Æthelred to escape maternal tutelage". Under the influence of new advisers, he carried through policies which involved encroachment on church privileges, and the proportion of grants to laymen rather than churchmen increased. The king ravaged the Diocese of Rochester and gave some of its land to a royal retainer, while Ealdorman Ælfric of Hampshire was able to buy the abbacy of Abingdon for his brother. In 985 his namesake, Ealdorman Ælfric Cild of Mercia, was exiled charged with treason, the details of which are not known. (Note: There were four prominent men called Ælfric in the period. In addition to the two ealdormen, there were also the leading scholar, Ælfric of Eynsham, and the Archbishop of Canterbury from 995 to 1005, Ælfric of Abingdon.)

=== Renewal of Viking raids 980–991 ===
After a generation of peace, Viking attacks resumed with small-scale raids in 980 and 982, commencing what is sometimes called the "Second Viking Age in England". In 988, the thegns of Devon defeated a force of invading Vikings in a bloody battle. The small-scale raids in the 980s would probably not have been considered worth recording if they had not been followed by major attacks, and in Stenton's view, their chief significance is that they brought England for the first time into diplomatic contact with Normandy as a result of the Normans allowing Danish raiders to use their ports. This led to a dispute which was mediated by an envoy of Pope John XV, who arranged a treaty agreed on 1 March 991 under which both parties agreed not to harbour each other's enemies. This interpretation of the treaty has been accepted by most scholars, but Jenny Benham argues that the raids were too small-scale to cause an international dispute. She also argues that they were directed against the south-west, so they are more likely to have been carried out by Vikings based in Ireland and the Irish Sea who would not have used Normandy as a base. She suggests that the treaty was concerned with attacks on pilgrims and merchants. The view that the raids in the 980s were probably launched by Vikings based around the Irish Sea is supported by Peter Sawyer.

In August 991 a much larger Danish fleet than any of the raiders of the 980s ravaged Ipswich. It then made its way around the coast to the estuary of the River Blackwater near Maldon, where it occupied Northey Island. Byrhtnoth led a local militia to give the invaders battle. The result was a crushing defeat for the English and the death of Byrhtnoth. After he fell, most of his army fled, but a group of his thegns fought to the death rather than desert their lord, and their loyalty and heroism inspired one of the most famous Old English poems, The Battle of Maldon.

=== England begins paying tributes 991–994 ===
Byrhtnoth was the second most senior ealdorman, and Roach comments that his defeat and death "sent shockwaves throughout the realm". The king and his counsellors decided, on the recommendation of Sigeric, Archbishop of Canterbury, to give a tribute (Note: The tributes (gafol) paid to Viking armies during Æthelred's reign were separate one-off amounts. Heregeld was an annual tax levied between 1012 and 1051, initially to pay Scandinavian mercenaries, and later to finance the armies of the Anglo-Danish kings. It was the basis for a post-Conquest tax which came to be known as Danegeld, and this term often later came to be wrongly used as a name for gafol and heregeld.) to the Danes of 10,000 pounds (Note: Calculating the modern value of Anglo-Saxon money is very difficult, particularly as the purchase power of the penny varied at different times and places, but 10,000 pounds is 2,400,000 pence, and each penny was probably equivalent to several tens of modern pounds sterling.) to leave England, "because of the great terror they were causing along the coast" according to ASC C. In 992 the English unsuccessfully attempted to defeat the Danes at sea, and in 993 a Viking army ravaged the north-east coast. In 994 the Viking army was led by the future king of Norway Olaf Tryggvason and Swein Forkbeard, the king of Denmark. They attacked the south-east and several local leaders entered into agreements to buy peace in their areas. Later that year, Æthelred entered into a formal treaty with the Vikings. The English paid 16,000 pounds in return for a promise that the Vikings would cease harrying. (Note: The figure of 16,000 pounds is given in ASC C. The treaty has 22,000 pounds, but this probably includes earlier payments made under local agreements.) Æthelred sponsored the confirmation of Olaf, who had probably earlier been baptised. After receiving gifts, Olaf promised "that he would never come back to England in hostility." He kept his promise, leaving to establish himself as king of Norway and never returning, and some Vikings entered King Æthelred's service as mercenaries.

=== Æthelred changes course ===
By 993 Æthelred had changed course and disowned his attacks on the church. No charters survive from 991 and 992, suggesting that the ordinary business of government was put on hold during the crisis following Byrhtnoth's defeat, and when they resume, their tone is very different from those of the period when Æthelred had rejected his father's counsellors. In Roach's view: "The king clearly saw recent misfortunes as divine justice and in doing so he tacitly accepted the teachings of the reformers." His mother enjoyed renewed status. Her eldest grandson, Æthelstan, states in his will that she brought him up, and she probably brought up other grandsons before her death around 1000 as she usually attested the same charters as they did. Her brother Ordwulf became one of Æthelred's leading advisers.

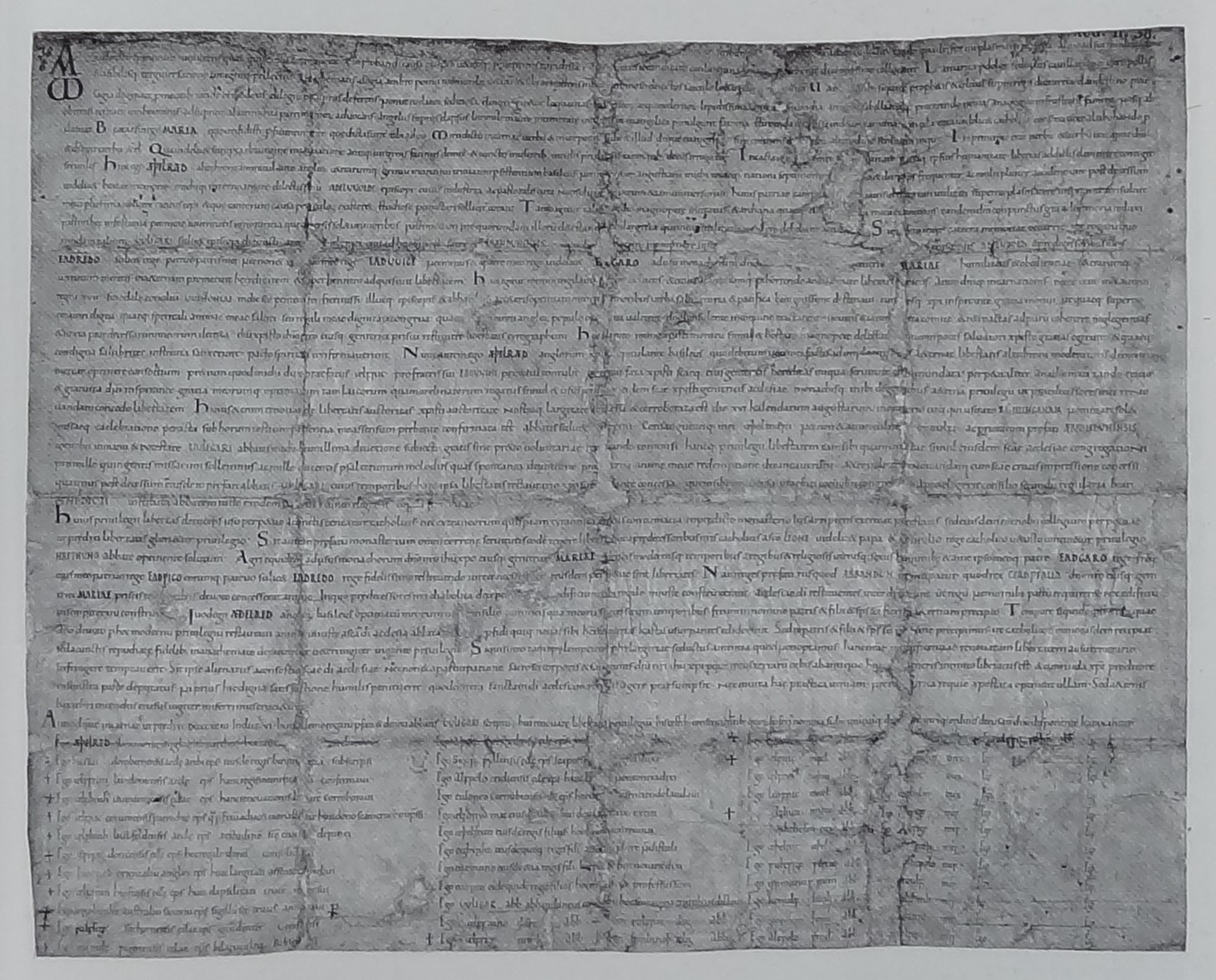
Charter S 876 of 4 June 993 in favour of Abingdon Abbey

In Charter S 876 of 993, Æthelred declared that Æthelwold's death had deprived the country of one "whose industry and pastoral care administered not only to my interest but also to that of all inhabitants of the country". The charter is one of the grandest in appearance to survive as an original from the Anglo-Saxon period, reflecting its political importance. It was issued at a meeting of the witan (king's council) at Winchester, and Æthelred declared that he had summoned the meeting "in order to be free of the terrible curse as quickly as possible". He attributed his own conduct "partly on account of the ignorance of my youth ... and partly on account of the abhorrent greed of certain of those men who ought to administer to my interest". He particularly blamed Ælfric of Hampshire and the late Wulfgar, Bishop of Ramsbury. In the same year Æthelred had Ælfric's son blinded. Ælfric was twice accused in ASC C of treachery in battles against the Danes, but it is uncertain whether the charges are justified. The allegations did not halt his rise in status, and he attested charters as the premier ealdorman between around 998 and the rise to dominance of Eadric Streona ten years later. Ælfric died fighting against the Danes in the Battle of Assandun in 1016.

In Charter S 893 of 998 Æthelred restored property which he had taken from St Andrew's Church, Rochester, and declared:

Now, however, because I have reached a mature age thanks to merciful heavenly kindness, I have decided to amend my childhood deeds. Therefore, encouraged by the grace of the Lord, I am reconsidering whatever I have unjustly done, encouraged then with wicked instigation against the sacred apostle of God; now, fully before God, with tearful contrition of my heart, I repent and restore freely that which rightly belongs to this place, hoping to receive the tears of my repentance and to be loosened from the fetters of my earlier ignorance by Him, Who does not desire the death of a sinner, but rather that he convert and live.

This is one of a number of charters in favour of religious houses by which Æthelred hoped to gain divine favour which would merit victory over the Vikings. In 998 he gave Wulfsige, Bishop of Sherborne, permission to convert his church's community of secular clergy into a monastic one, and bishops and abbots became more prominent as charter signatories. In the mid to late 980s only three or four abbots attested, but from 990 there were often ten or more, and Æthelred made many grants to the Church in the late 990s and early 1000s.

=== Cult of King Edward the Martyr ===
There was a tradition in Anglo-Saxon England of venerating murdered kings as saints, especially if they were young, and the circumstances of Edward's death made it almost inevitable that he would be revered but there is little evidence of a cult before around 990, when miracles were first reported at his grave, just when Viking attacks were increasing. Æthelred took the lead in promoting his half-brother's cult, and in the mid-990s he founded Cholsey Abbey, which was dedicated to Edward. In 1001 his remains were translated for a second time on Æthelred's orders, this time to a more prominent place in Shaftesbury Abbey. Æthelred encouraged his sons to support the cult, and Æthelstan, who died two years before his father, left six pounds to "St Edward and Shaftesbury" in his will. Æthelred also promoted the cult of his half-sister Edith.

=== Viking raids 997–1002 ===
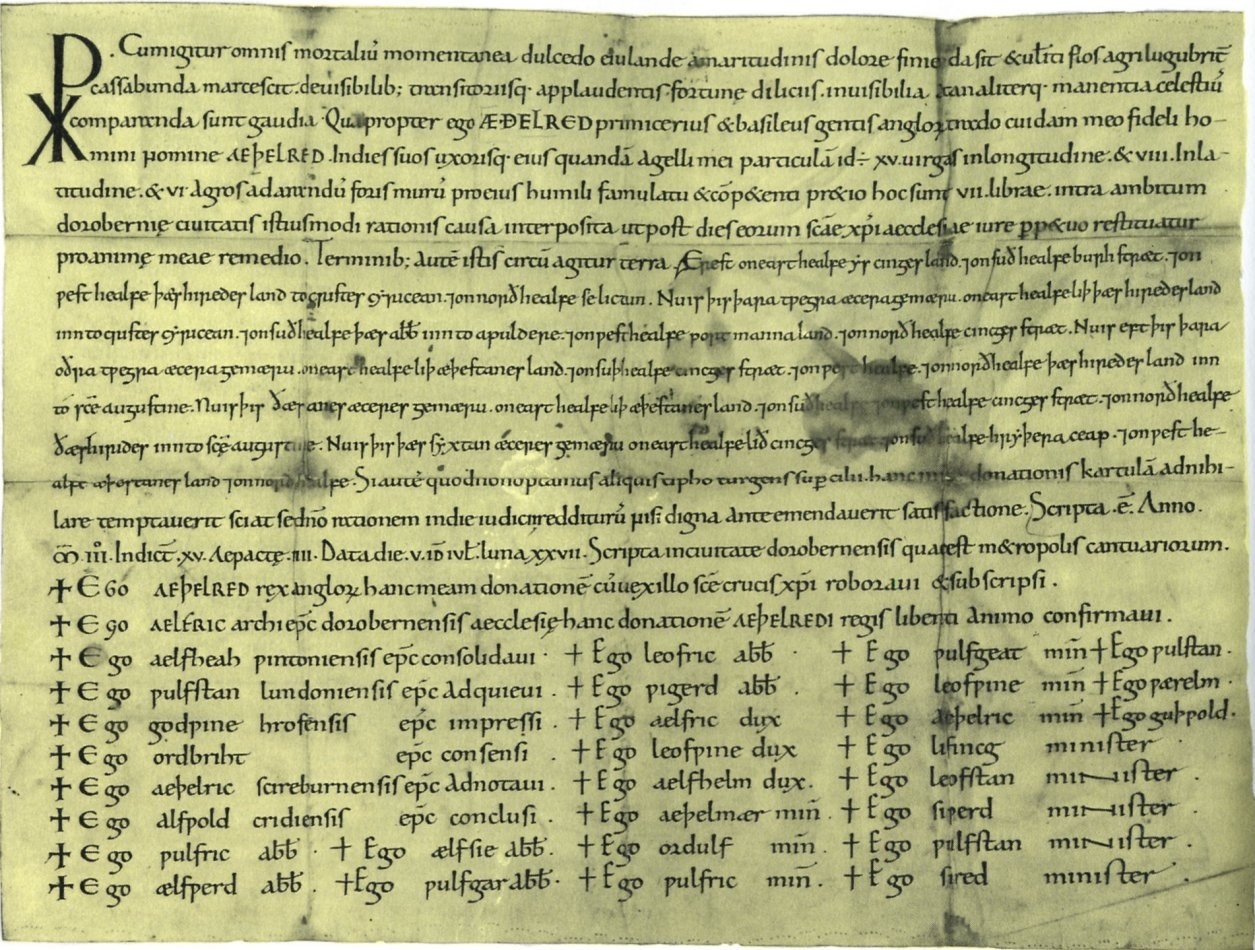
Charter S 905 of Æthelred in 1002 granting land in Canterbury for seven pounds to a man also called Æthelred and his wife, with restoration to the Church on their deaths

In 997 Danish raids resumed. In that year a Viking army harried Cornwall, Devon, western Somerset and south Wales, Dorset in 998, and Kent in 999. The only year thereafter when England was free of raids was 1000, when the Viking fleet left England for Normandy. Æthelred led an army to ravage Cumberland and his navy attacked the Isle of Man, probably in response to raids by the king of Strathclyde and Norse (Norwegian) Vikings based in Ireland and the islands of the Irish Sea.

In 1001 a Danish fleet – perhaps the same fleet which left in 1000 – ravaged in Hampshire and Devon, though the English mounted a successful defence at Exeter. In the spring of 1002, the English bought peace for 24,000 pounds. According to William of Jumièges, writing in the 1050s, in around 1002 an English fleet launched an attack on the Cotentin peninsula in Normandy. This may have been a response to Norman harbouring of the Vikings, although William is not reliable on dating. The disputes between Æthelred and Richard II, Duke of Normandy, were settled by negotiations which resulted in the marriage of Richard's sister Emma to Æthelred in 1002. This was the first marriage of an English king to a foreign bride since the 850s. It is not known whether Æthelred's first wife, probably called Ælfgifu, had died or was set aside. Emma had a high status at court and attested charters in a prominent position.

=== St Brice's Day massacre of 1002 ===
ASC C states that Æthelred ordered the massacre of all Danish men in England on 13 November 1002, St Brice's Day, "because the king had been informed that they would treacherously deprive him, and then all his councillors, of life, and possess this kingdom afterwards". It is very unlikely that there was a massacre of the whole Scandinavian population. It may have been directed at recent immigrants, who were suspect because of the conduct of mercenaries who took service with the English and then deserted back to the Viking side, such as the Danish chieftain Pallig. The order was probably popular, and there is evidence that it was carried out in Oxford. A charter of 1004 relating to the Oxford church of St Frideswide stated that it had been burnt down when Danes in the town had taken refuge in it during the massacre. However, the slaughter was limited even in this region, as shortly afterwards Æthelred granted land to Toti the Dane at Beckley and Horton in Oxfordshire. Roach comments that "even if restricted in scope, these attacks speak unmistakably of desperation and paranoia, both of which were to be very much in evidence in Æthelred's later years. They show that the king was starting to chase shadows, and he was unlikely to stop there."

=== Decline 1003 to 1012 ===
Swein returned to England in 1003, after an absence of nearly ten years. The twelfth-century historian William of Malmesbury attributed his reappearance to a desire to avenge the murder of his sister Gunhilde on the order of Eadric Streona in the St Brice's Day massacre, and this is accepted by Stenton. Other historians are sceptical, as William is the only source for Gunhilde's existence and Eadric did not become prominent until several years later. In 1003 Swein sacked Exeter and burnt Wilton. In 1004 he burnt Norwich and sacked Thetford. He was then challenged by an army led by an East Anglian nobleman, Ulfcytel. The Danes were victorious, but they suffered heavy losses and said that "they never met worst fighting amongst the English than that which Ulfcytel dealt them". The Danish army left England in 1005, probably because Britain and the Continent suffered from a severe famine in that year.

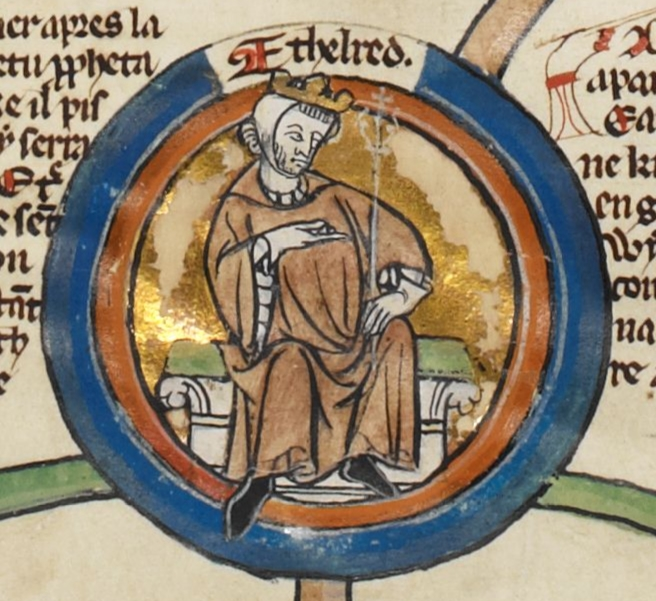
Æthelred in a late thirteenth-century genealogical roll

In 1005 and 1006 Æthelred carried through changes described by historians as a "palace revolution". In about 1006 King Malcolm II of Scotland attacked Durham and was defeated by Uhtred, the son of the elderly Waltheof, ealdorman of Bamburgh in north Northumbria. Æthelred then appointed Uhtred ealdorman of Bamburgh, even though his father was still alive, and made him the ealdorman of the whole of Northumbria by adding York after its ealdorman, Ælfhelm, was murdered by Eadric Streona with the approval of the king. The three leading thegns since the 990s left the court at this time. Æthelmær and Ordwulf (Æthelred's uncle) retired to monasteries, and Wulfgeat had his land confiscated. Eadric Streona started his rise to become the most powerful of Æthelred's counsellors around this time and he was probably behind these changes. Roach thinks that Æthelred concluded that if he was not to blame for the failures then they must be the fault of his advisers, and the changes were part of an attempt to gain the support of God against the Danes by a moral cleansing of the court. Eadric Streona and his allies were able to take advantage of Æthelred's growing paranoia to rise rapidly in power. Nevertheless, many magnates kept their positions, including two ealdormen.

In 1006, according to ASC C, "the great fleet came to Sandwich, and did just as they were accustomed, ravaged, burnt and slew as they went". For the first time a national army of Wessex and Mercia was called up, but it achieved nothing. As winter approached the Danes retreated to the Isle of Wight, but they then launched a surprise winter attack and defeated the main English army near Reading. In 1007 they were bought off with a tribute of 36,000 pounds, and for the next two years England was free from attack. In 1008, a fleet of warships was built and assembled at Sandwich, but a dispute broke out among the magnates. A Sussex noble, Wulfnoth, was accused by Eadric's brother Brihtric of unknown crimes, and Wulfnoth deserted with twenty ships to ravage the south coast. Brihtric chased after him with eighty ships, but they were wrecked in a storm. The king and his council decided not to risk the weakened fleet in a general action and the remaining ships were sailed to London.

To Stenton: "The history of England in the next generation was really determined between 1009 and 1012 ... the ignominious collapse of the English defence caused a loss of morale which was irreparable." In August 1009 a Danish army led by Thorkell the Tall and his brother Hemming landed at Sandwich. It was the most formidable force to invade England since Æthelred became king. It went to Canterbury, which made terms and then East Kent, which paid 3,000 pounds for a truce. London defeated several attacks. In May 1010 the Vikings defeated Ulfcytel in the Battle of Ringmere and went on to burn Thetford and Cambridge. By this stage English resistance had disintegrated and in 1011 the Danish army was able to move around at will. In September 1011 the Vikings seized Canterbury and captured Archbishop Ælfheah. The English agreed a tribute of 48,000 pounds, and the Vikings demanded an additional ransom for the archbishop, but he refused and was murdered in April 1012 by drunken Vikings, in spite of Thorkell's attempts to protect him. Shortly afterwards the tribute was paid and the army dispersed, apart from Thorkell's personal following of forty-five ships, which entered Æthelred's service. They were probably paid by the institution of a new tax called the heregeld (army tax).

=== Defeat and exile 1013 ===
In August 1013 Swein Forkbeard launched an invasion of England with a large fleet. This was different from previous attacks because he intended from the start to conquer England and make himself king. He landed at Sandwich in Kent, but immediately sailed round East Anglia to Gainsborough, perhaps because the south was too strongly guarded by the fleets of Thorkell and Æthelred. Swein received the submission of Northumbria and the Five Boroughs of the north Midlands. He then marched south, and Oxford and Winchester quickly surrendered, but London, which was defended by Æthelred and Thorkell, stood firm and inflicted heavy losses on the Danes. Swein then went to Bath where he received the submission of the south-west. With almost the whole country under his control, the Londoners accepted his rule and Æthelred sent his wife Emma to her brother in Normandy, followed by their children. Æthelred celebrated Christmas on the Isle of Wight before joining his wife in exile.

=== Æthelred's second reign 1014 to 1016 ===
The situation changed suddenly when Swein died on 3 February 1014. The Danish army immediately elected his son Cnut as king, but the leading English magnates seized the opportunity to return to their traditional allegiance in what the historian Simon Keynes calls "a sign of a basic sense of loyalty to a consecrated king". According to ASC C:

Then all the councillors who were in England, ecclesiastical and lay, determined to send for King Æthelred, and they said that no lord was dearer to them than their natural lord if he would govern them more justly than he did before. Then the king sent his son Edward hither with his messengers and bade them greet all his people, and said that he would be a gracious lord to them, and reform all the things which they hated; and all the things that had been said and done against him should be forgiven, on condition that they all unanimously turned to him without treachery. And complete friendship was then established with oath and pledge on both sides, and they pronounced every Danish king an outlaw from England for ever.

These pledges could only have been imposed on Æthelred because his rule was seen as both unjust and a military failure, and Molyneaux sees the ability of the magnates to act collectively in the king's absence as "an illustration of the coherence of the English kingdom". Stenton comments that the terms "are of great constitutional interest as the first recorded pact between an English king and his subjects". Æthelred returned to England and went to London, the one place which had been consistently loyal to him in recent years. In late April he went north and drove Cnut out of the country. Before he left, Cnut ordered the hands, nose and ears of his hostages to be cut off. Thorkell's army was at Greenwich and Æthelred raised a tax of 21,000 pounds to pay it off.

Æthelred's oldest son Æthelstan died in June 1014. His will survives and the main beneficiary was his oldest surviving brother, the future King Edmund Ironside, who received estates and the sword of the famous Mercian king Offa. Æthelstan also made a bequest to Sigeferth, a leading north Midlands thegn and an opponent of Eadric Streona. The will suggests that Æthelred's elder sons were probably allied with a party opposed to Eadric. The principal magnates of the Five Boroughs, Sigeferth and his brother Morcar, had surrendered to Swein in 1013 and returned to their traditional allegiance when he died. In early 1015 Eadric had them murdered, almost certainly on the order of Æthelred, who seized their lands and confined Sigeferth's widow Ealdgyth in Malmesbury Abbey. The killings destabilised the restored regime and Williams describes them as "a serious error of judgement" by Æthelred. It was an attack on close friends of the æthelings and on key figures in the crown's fragile hold on northern England. Edmund promptly rescued Ealdgyth without the king's permission and married her. By September he had marched north, taken possession of the brothers' lands and accepted the submission of the people of the area.

Edmund was now in revolt against his father, but the situation changed when Cnut reappeared and ravaged in Wessex. Æthelred was sick, but efforts were made to unite the English against the invasion. Eadric Streona raised an army in the south and Edmund in the north, but Eadric then defected with forty ships and Wessex submitted to Cnut. In December 1015 Edmund raised a new army, but they refused to march without the support of the king and the Londoners. Edmund raised another army after Christmas, and persuaded Æthelred to join them, but the suspicion between father and son was too great and Æthelred soon left, fearing treachery. Edmund then persuaded Uhtred of Northumbria to join him. They ravaged the territories loyal to Cnut, who retaliated by ravaging the north. When Uhtred's own lands were threatened, he submitted to Cnut, who executed him. Edmund had to abandon the north and joined his father in London, where Æthelred died on 23 April 1016.

=== Legislation ===
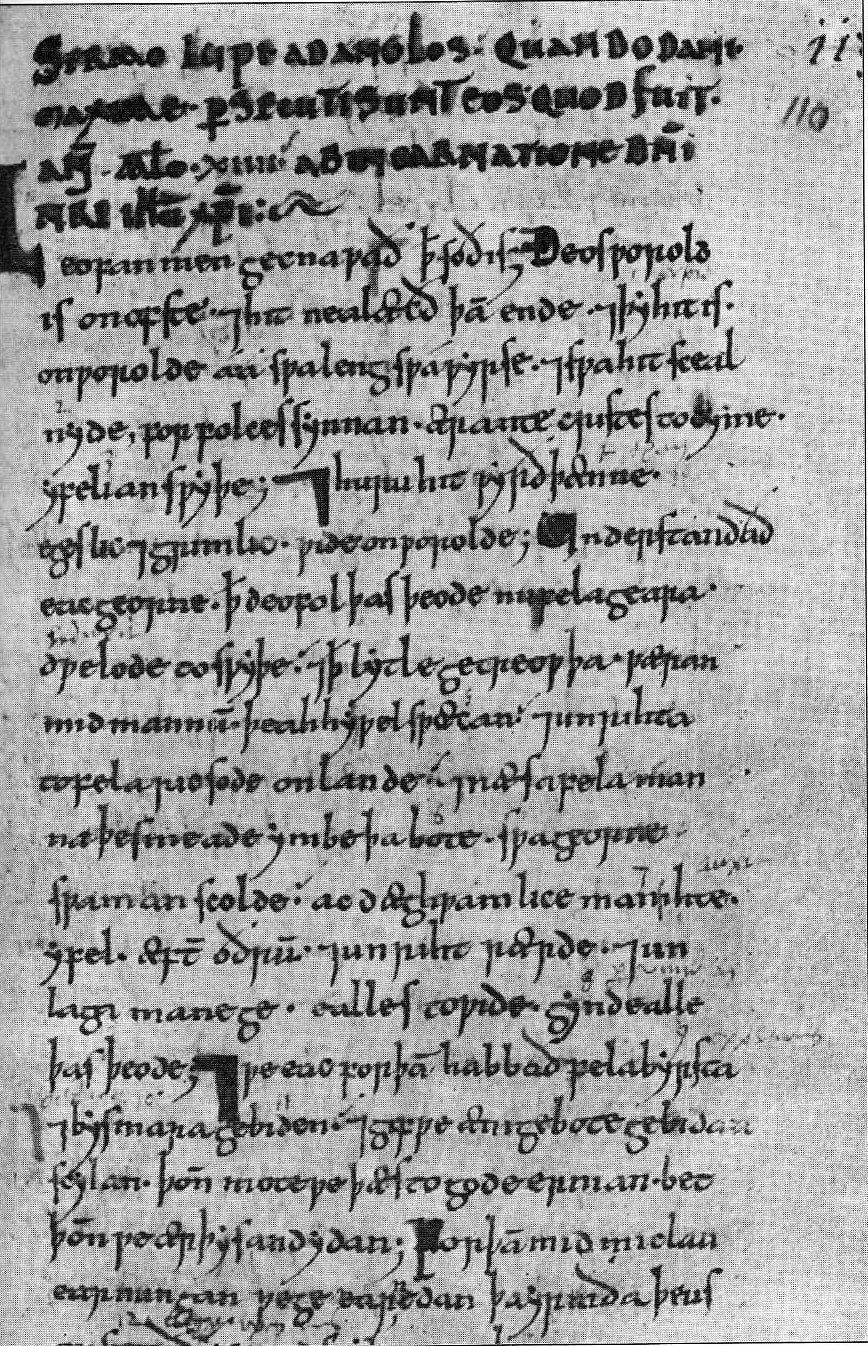
Page of the Sermo Lupi ad Anglos (Sermon of the Wolf to the English) by Wulfstan

There are between ten and twelve surviving law codes or parts of codes from Æthelred's reign, (Note: Æthelred's laws are translated by Agnes Robertson and summarised by Richard Huscroft.) more than any other Anglo-Saxon king and the most before Edward I (1272–1307). They were issued in two periods, firstly between about 993 and 997, and secondly between about 1008 and 1014. In the view of Keynes, the 990s "may have seen some of the finest legislation ever produced by the Anglo-Saxon kings", while Wormald writes: "It is hard not to be impressed by the panache with which draftsmen were by now handling legal material." Meetings of the witan in 997 produced two related law codes, named after the places where they were approved: I Æthelred (the Woodstock code) and III Æthelred (the Wantage code). The Woodstock code applied to areas under English law, whereas the Wantage Code applied to the Five Boroughs of the Danelaw. Wormald comments that the provisions and vocabulary of the Wantage Code are so thoroughly Scandinavian that it could not have been drawn up by a West Saxon, and its author must have been an expert on Danelaw usage. However, in the view of the legal historian John Hudson the code is "best interpreted as the English king imposing measures at least some of which resembled those applied elsewhere in the kingdom". Edgar decreed in the early 970s that Danish areas should be governed by the laws they thought best, but the term Danelaw (Dena lage) was first used in VI Æthelred in 1008.

Æthelred's early codes were mainly concerned with secular law, whereas the later ones, written by Wulfstan, Archbishop of York, were ecclesiastical. He was a political theorist whose Institutes of Polity advised the king of his responsibilities for the proper government of the kingdom, although Keynes comments that "his advice was more notable for its ideology than valuable for its practicality". Wulfstan's codes included VII Æthelred, which dates to 1009, and VIII Æthelred, which was issued after Æthelred's return to England in 1014. Wormald observes that the "intense, almost pleading, tone of Æthelred's later codes was once seen as yet another sign of his government's flailing inadequacy. Yet ... it is hardly less evident in Cnut's laws"; "[Wulfstan's] was the language of the preacher, not the lawyer." Some historians have complained that Wulfstan's codes are a mixture of homilies and laws, but Martin Ryan argues that this is anachronistic because in the later Anglo-Saxon period they were seen as part of a continuum rather than separate categories. Wulfstan did not distinguish between sins and crimes. Wormald describes the codes of the last years of Æthelred's reign and the first decade of Cnut's as the "last phase of Old English law".

=== Administration ===
Major decisions, such as the election of kings, archbishops and bishops, the adoption of law codes, the approval of charters granting land and the settlement of disputes, were taken by ecclesiastical and lay magnates at meetings of the witan, and Æthelred often recorded that he was acting after taking counsel with his great men. Many charters were drafted by officials of a central writing office which was part of the Æthelred's royal household. The office also sent out Æthelred's instructions in writing and by oral messages, accompanied by his seal as proof of authenticity. Keynes comments that "one should not underestimate the degree of sophistication in the management of private and official business during Æthelred's reign". London became a key administrative, financial and military centre under Æthelred. It offered the stoutest resistance of any area to the Vikings and became his main base during the later stages of the war.

There were several types of reeve, royal officials who carried out local administrative duties, and the most important, the shire-reeve or sheriff, is first recorded in Æthelred's reign. The shire-reeve was the king's representative in the shire and his duties included collecting money due to the king, arranging meetings of local courts and organising military forces. Æthelred appears to have tried to prevent the disputes which disrupted Edward's reign by leaving ealdormanry positions vacant and relying more on reeves. Out of five ealdormen who died or were removed from office between 978 and 1002 who had grown sons, none were succeeded by their sons (except one later) and no son was given any official position. However, Æthelred's manipulation of royal patronage could create tensions among ambitious men seeking the favour of the king. For most of his reign ealdormen witnessed charters in order of the dates of their appointment, with the longest serving first: Ælfhere of Mercia was senior from 978 to 983, Æthelwine of East Anglia from 983 to 992, Æthelweard of the Western Provinces from 992 to 998, and Ælfric of Hampshire from 999 to between 1009 and 1012. This means that they are an uncertain guide to who was the most influential. From 1009x1012 this pattern was broken: thereafter there was no fixed order apart from Eadric Streona always attesting first even though he was not the longest serving, indicating his rise to dominance.

Molyneaux argues that administrative reforms around the time of Edgar unified England and made it the single political entity which Æthelred inherited. This increased the power of kings to impose controls on the mass of the people by measures such as laws and coinage reforms, and their dealings became more routine and impersonal. By contrast, royal power over the aristocracy remained personal, dependent on patronage and coercion, such as dismissal from office, expropriation of land, blinding and execution. Æthelred's arbitrary dealings with his magnates and his heavy taxation in support of unsuccessful wars led to increasing efforts to impose restraints on his arbitrary power, which culminated in the pledges Æthelred had to give on his return from exile in 1014. Another important factor was that the concern among religious thinkers that kings should be required to rule justly became stronger in this period.

Between a quarter and a third of all surviving records of lawsuits in the Anglo-Saxon period date to Æthelred's reign. Contributory factors were the high number of forfeitures and the monasteries' efforts to hold on to the lands granted to them by Edgar. Like other kings, Æthelred was sometimes unable to enforce his orders in the face of resistance by powerful nobles, as in the case of a man called Wulfbald, who held on to estates he had seized illegally in spite of repeated royal orders to surrender them. Æthelred was able to recover the estates after Wulfbald died, but only after his widow's men had killed a thegn and fifteen of his companions.

Law codes and sermons demanding piety, lawful and moral conduct, charity to the poor and payment of church dues were an important part of the English efforts to assuage God's wrath and thus save the country from the Vikings. The sermons and law codes of Wulfstan were a dominant influence. Roach comments that his Sermo Lupi ad Anglos (Sermon of the Wolf to the English) is "in a sense a more impassioned version of the kind of ideas ... expressed in charters, letters and legal ordinances since the 990s: the archbishop sees the Vikings above all as a moral threat, which can only be confronted (if it is to be confronted at all) by a return to pious ways. That the king felt similarly stands to reason".

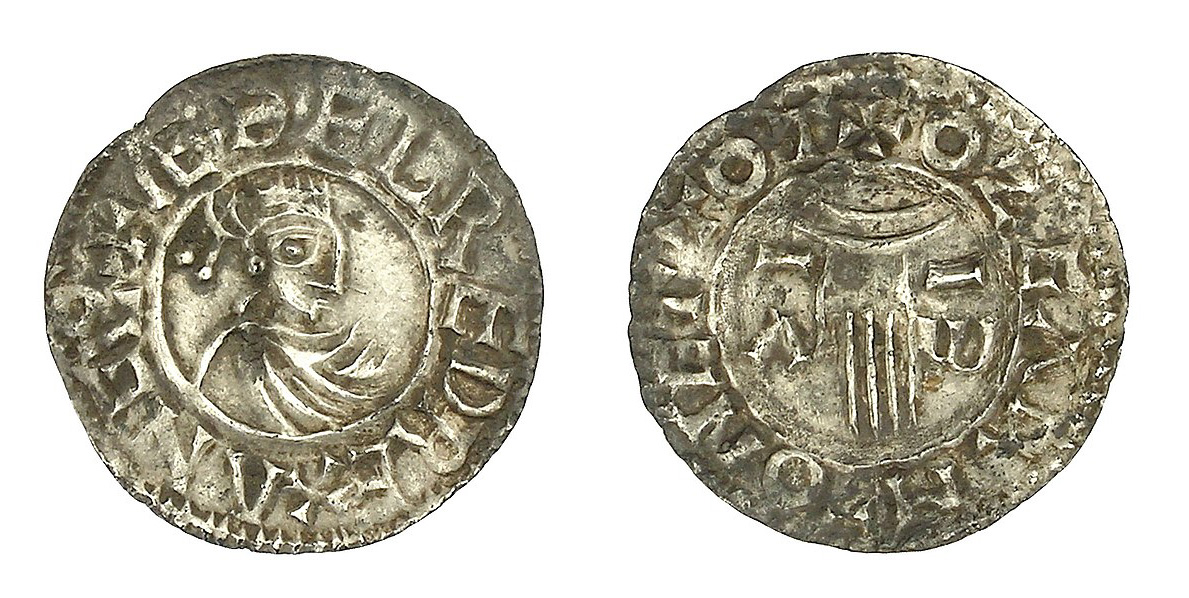
Silver penny, First Hand type with the hand of God on the reverse, Totnes mint, moneyer Ozgar

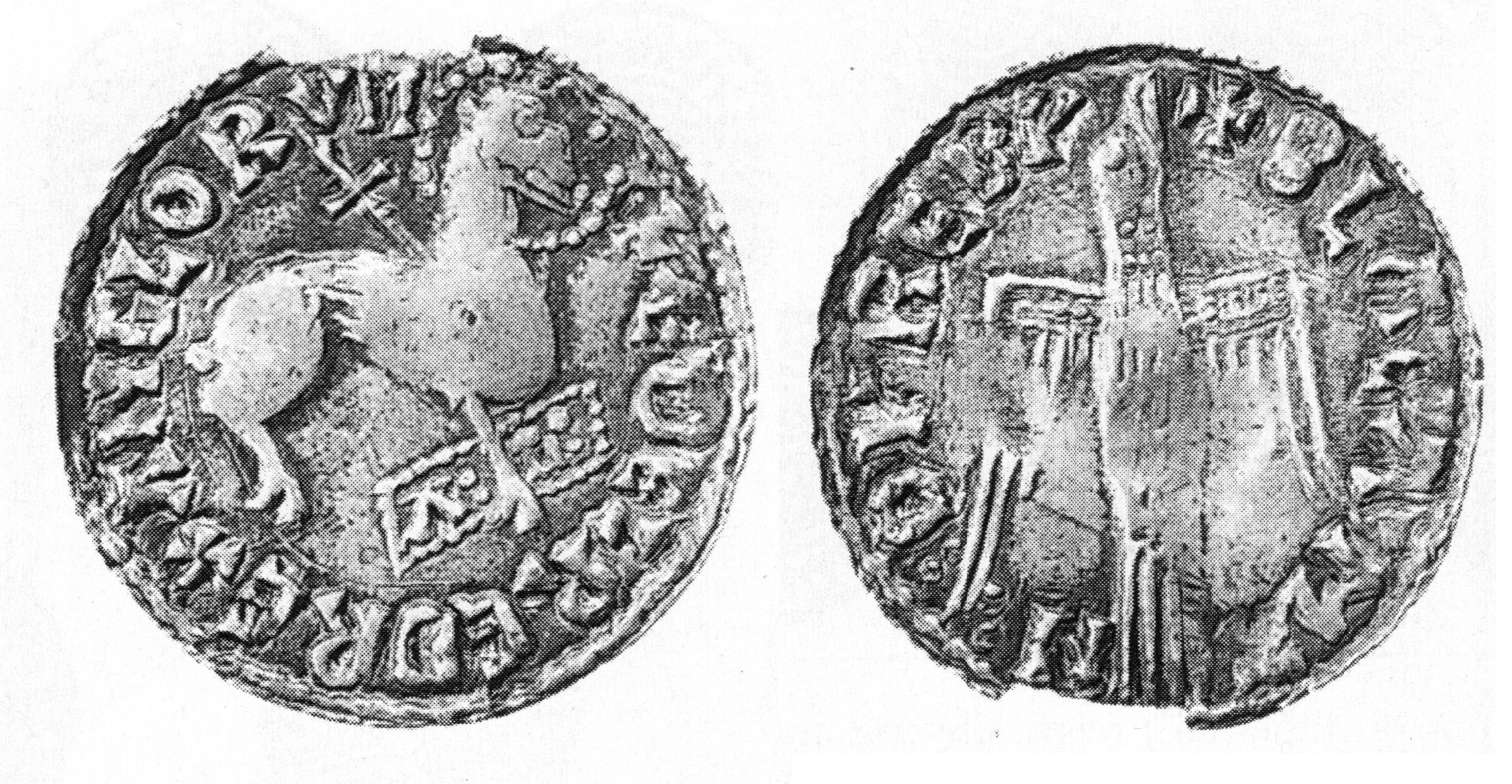
Silver penny, Agnus Dei type. The obverse has the Lamb of God and the reverse the Holy Spirit shown as a dove.

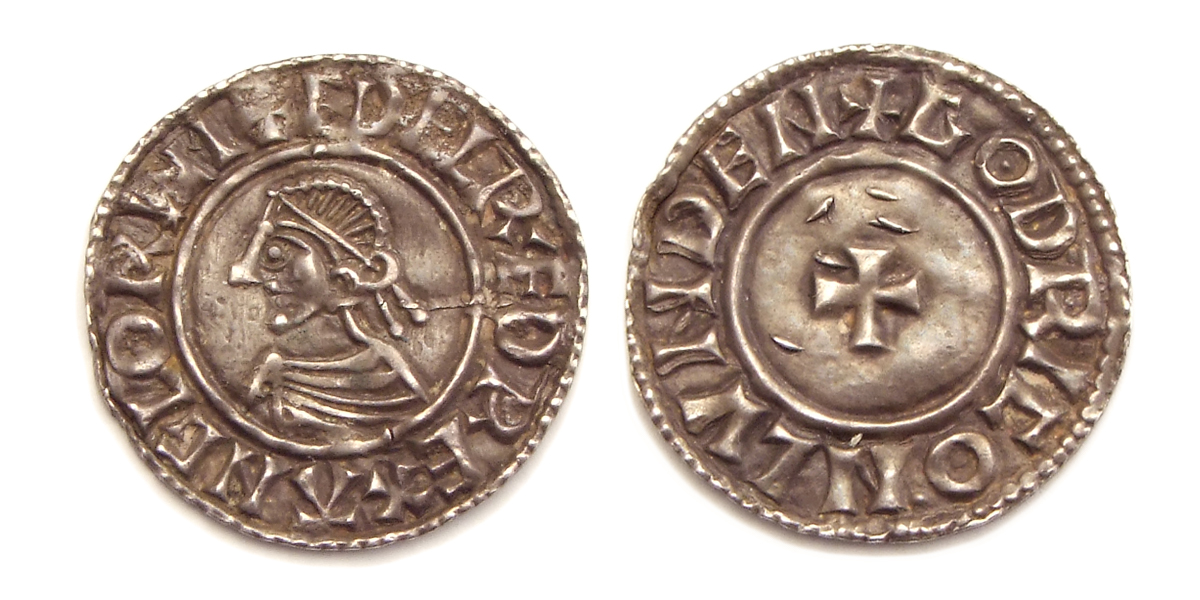
Silver penny, Last Small Cross type, London mint, moneyer Godric

Late Anglo-Saxon kings such as Æthelred commanded great wealth. They were able to raise vast sums through taxation and periodic reminting of the coinage, and they owned large royal estates, mainly in Wessex and south-west Mercia. The total amount paid in tribute to Viking armies was extremely high, particularly compared with the amounts that later medieval English kings were able to raise. Most historians accept their accuracy, but John Gillingham argues that they are impossibly high.

Æthelred had close contacts with the Continent. Lavelle writes: "The kingdom of the English did not exist in isolation in a forgotten corner of Christendom. By the end of the tenth century, politically, culturally and economically, England was 'at the heart of Europe', and it had been for some centuries." The treaty with Normandy in 991, Æthelred's marriage to Emma and his exile in Normandy in 1013–1014, show that relations with Normandy were particularly important. According to the eleventh-century chronicler Ralph Glaber Æthelred sent gifts to King Robert II of France and asked for his assistance.

=== Coinage ===
Edgar had carried through a major overhaul of the coinage, with a single design based on dies supplied from one centre, replacing the old system of local designs. Coins had the king's name and his stylised head on the obverse and the name of the moneyer and town of issue on the reverse. Æthelred carried on this system. He and his advisers applied the principle of frequent recoinages more effectively than it had been in the past, helping to create a system which was influential on the European coinages of the central Middle Ages. The standard of purity of the silver was high, apart from occasional localised debasement later in the reign.

The numismatist Rory Naismith summarises Æthelred's coinage:

Æthelred's reign, from the institution of the Hand types onwards, is at the heart of the late Anglo-Saxon coinage system. It saw the fullest development of systematic recoinage, as well as several anomalous types which shed light on the workings of the currency more generally. Yet these small types also emphasise the fact that Æthelred's coinage was still a complex and evolving entity. Its impressive sequence of type-changes only came into being after a period of trial and improvement, especially in the early part of the reign.

Hand types, which have an image of the hand of God on the reverse, were minted in the 980s. The Crux type, which has a cross in the inner circle on the reverse, was produced in much greater quantities in the mid-990s, and it may have been produced in the context of Æthelred's repentance for his youthful misdeeds. It is the first late Anglo-Saxon type to be found on a large scale in hoards in Scandinavia, and much of it may have been taken there as part of tribute, although this has been questioned as there are even more German coins and few Viking raids have been recorded on Germany. The Long Cross type, with a cross which extends into the outer circle, was minted from the late 990s to the late 1000s. The rare Helmet type, which has a helmeted bust of the king on the obverse, was minted from around 1003. It may be intended to portray the king taking the fight to the Vikings. The very rare Agnus Dei type, which portrays the Lamb of God on the obverse instead of the king, probably dates to the crisis of 1009. The final issue was the Last Small Cross type, the production of which commenced around 1009 and continued briefly into Cnut's reign.

== Burial ==
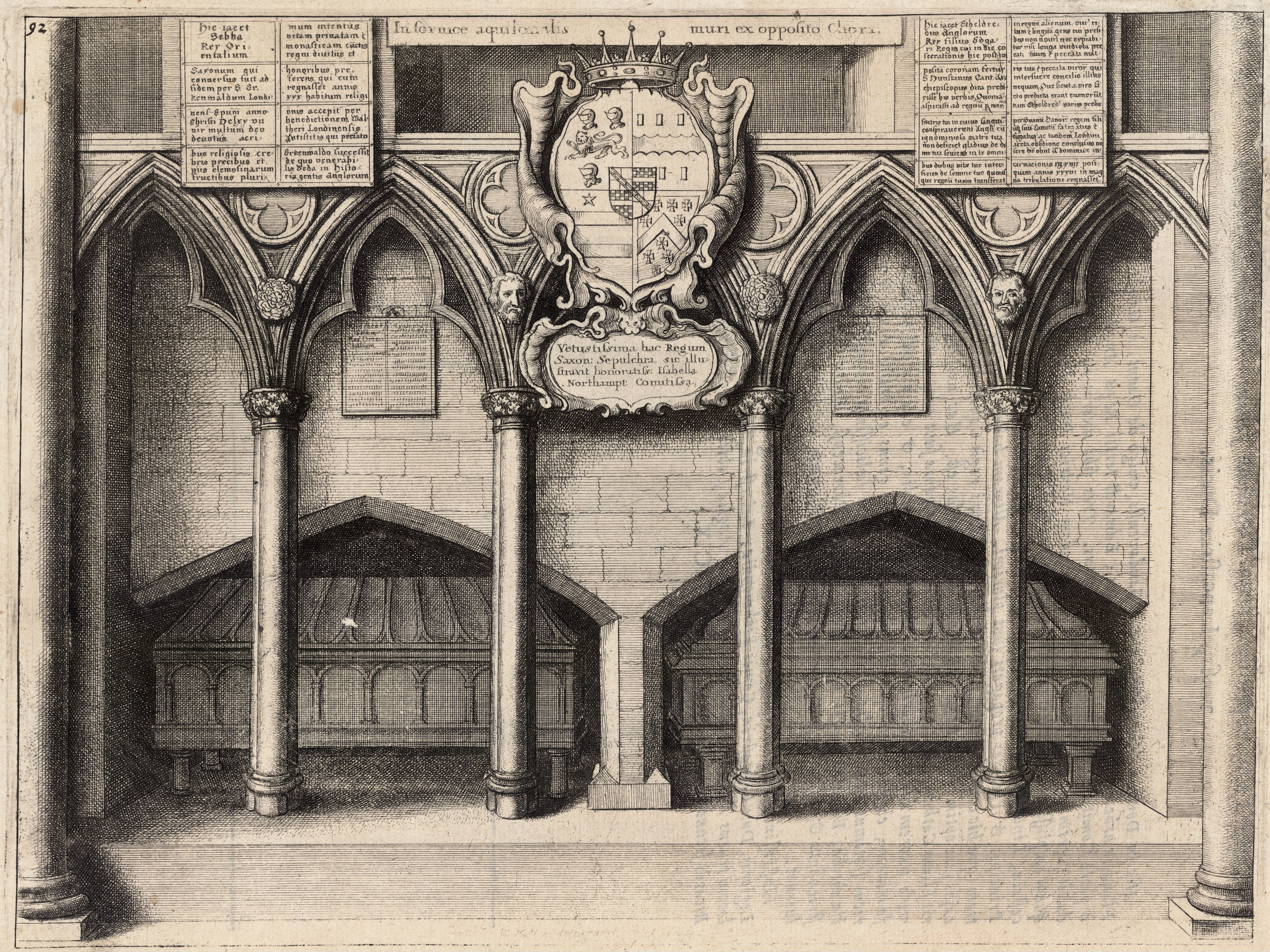
Seventeenth-century etching of the twelfth-century tomb of Kings Sæbbi of Essex and Æthelred in Old St Paul's Cathedral by Wenceslaus Hollar

Æthelred was buried in the choir of Old St Paul's Cathedral, London. The tomb, which dated to the mid-twelfth century, was destroyed along with the cathedral in the Great Fire of London in 1666. A modern monument in the crypt lists important graves lost including that of Æthelred. Æthelred was the first king to be buried there since Sæbbi of Essex in the seventh century.

== Aftermath ==
After Æthelred's death, Edmund was chosen by the Londoners as king and Cnut was elected at Southampton. Following two inconclusive battles, Edmund lifted the Danish siege of London and then defeated the Danes at Brentford and Otford. He pursued Cnut into Kent, and Eadric Streona defected back to him. On 18 October 1016 Edmund was defeated at the Battle of Assandun with heavy losses, including many leading men, after Eadric and his men fled the field. Edmund and Cnut then agreed to divide the kingdom with Edmund taking the lands south of the Thames and Cnut those north. Edmund died on 30 November and Cnut became undisputed king of England. A year later, he had Eadric murdered.

== Primary sources ==
The principal narrative sources for Æthelred's reign are ASC C, ASC D and ASC E, which are all based on a version of the Anglo-Saxon Chronicle written, probably in London, between 1016 and 1023, after Æthelred's death and the Danish Viking conquest of England. These recensions attribute the defeat to English incompetence and cowardice, which is blamed on Æthelred's lieutenants rather than on the king himself. Since the 1970s historians have become increasingly sceptical of the reliability of this account, seeing it as biased by knowledge of the disastrous outcome of Æthelred's reign. Roach comments in his biography of Æthelred that "foreknowledge of the eventual English defeat haunts [the chronicler's] writing at every turn", while to Keynes the chronicler "was like a dead man conducting his own post-mortem". The only year in Æthelred's reign for which two independent annals survive, the contemporary ASC A as well as the later ASC C, is 1001. ASC A states that at Pinhoe in Devon local officials gathered together what forces they could and were overwhelmed by a Viking army, whereas according to ASC C an immense English army ran away without putting up a fight. In Keynes's view, the contrast shows the bias in the account written in hindsight.

Anglo-Norman historians such as William of Malmesbury condemned Æthelred as a disastrous king. By contrast, Scandinavian skaldic poetry, written in honour of Viking heroes, depicts Æthelred in a favourable light. The Icelandic poet Gunnlaugr ormstunga visited Æthelred's court in the early 1000s and recited a praise poem describing him as a "generous and dauntless prince". Skaldic poetry is not regarded by historians as a reliable source, but Russell Poole argues that it "may have more to contribute than is commonly acknowledged".

Anglo-Saxon kings held periodic meetings of lay and ecclesiastical magnates of the witan. The men (almost never women) attending included members of the royal family, archbishops, bishops, leading abbots, ealdormen and thegns. Ealdormen governed large areas as the king's representatives and led local levies in battle. Thegns owned substantial land and played an important administrative and military role. Charters were issued at these meetings, and lists of witnesses (or attesters) to charters provide evidence of the names and status of those at the meetings. However, the lists are often shortened, particularly if they are later copies. Charters usually only survive if they have been preserved in the libraries of religious houses, and so there are few extant grants to laymen. Many charters are fraudulent, but some eighty-four from Æthelred's reign are described by Roach as "having good claims to authenticity", enough to be a relatively representative sample. Ten are originals, with the rest being copies which may have been altered in error or to suit the interests of the copyist's religious house. Most show the date of issue, but few the place of issue, and very little information is available about where Æthelred and his court were at any particular time. Law codes, coins and contemporary literary productions are also important sources.

== Achievements ==
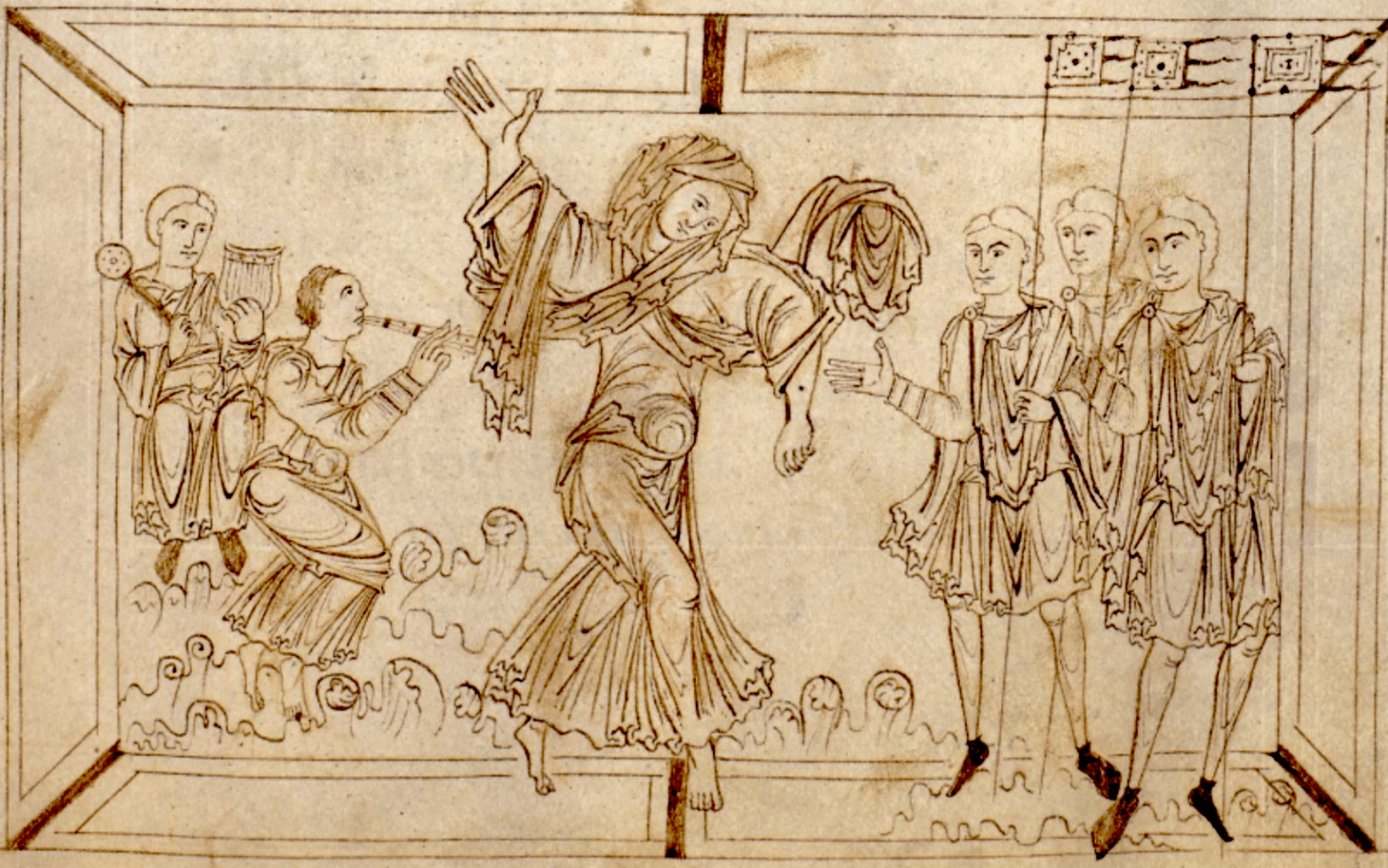
Illustration in a late tenth-century Anglo-Saxon manuscript of the Psychomachia by Prudentius

Keynes comments that although Æthelred's reign saw military failures and payments of tribute, "a case could be made for regarding the 990s in particular as a period when the internal affairs of Æthelred's kingdom prospered, under the guidance of the king acting with the assistance and advice of a group of distinguished ecclesiastics and laymen". Keynes concludes from his study of charter witness lists that "one cannot avoid the impression that during the 990s and early 1000s the king was surrounded by men of considerable calibre, many of whom turn out to have been closely associated with the advancement of the monastic cause". Williams states that "Æthelred's leading ecclesiastics were a close-knit group, committed in varying ways to the ideals of the monastic reform movement". Æthelred's appointments to the post of Archbishop of Canterbury were all experienced reformist leaders, Æthelgar, Sigeric, Ælfric, Ælfheah and Lyfing, and according to the historian Frank Barlow the bishops inherited by Cnut "seem to have been more than respectable". The turn of the century saw a revival in the monastic reform movement after the decline in Edward's reign and the early part of Æthelred's; in addition to the restoration of land to monasteries, new ones were established and existing ones received new endowments. Keynes comments: "One might even consider the possibility that the period was one of the most prosperous for the advancement of the ecclesiastical cause before the Norman Conquest." On the other hand, Barlow and John Blair see the period as one when the reform movement lost momentum before gradually declining in the period leading up to the Conquest.

At the beginning of the eleventh century, a number of Anglo-Saxon monks, described by the historian of religion David Knowles as "small perhaps but influential", embarked on missionary activity in Norway and Sweden, and many of those who went to Sweden were martyred.

The period was one of cultural achievements. Some of the finest Anglo-Saxon illuminated manuscripts date to the period around 1000, and there were also major works of Old English and Anglo-Latin literature, especially those by Ælfric of Eynsham, who is described by the scholar of Latin philology Claudio Leonardi as "the highest pinnacle of Benedictine reform and Anglo-Latin literature".

== Reputation ==
In the nineteenth century, historians dismissed Æthelred as a bad man and an incompetent king, and this view was endorsed by leading historians in the early and middle twentieth century. In Stenton's Anglo-Saxon England, which is described by Keynes as "magisterial and massively authoritative", the English defeat is attributed to Æthelred personally:

Much that has brought the condemnation of historians on King Æthelred may well be due in the last resort to the circumstances under which he became king. Throughout his reign he behaved like a man who is never sure of himself. His ineffectiveness in war, which is very remarkable in a man of his line, his acts of spasmodic violence, and the air of mistrust which overhangs his relations with his nobles, are signs of a trouble which lies deeper than mere incapacity for government. They suggest the reaction of a weak king to the consciousness that he had come to power through what his subjects regarded as the worst crime committed among the English peoples since their first coming to Britain.

Opinion began to change in the 1970s, particularly as a result of PhD dissertations and subsequent publications by Keynes and Stafford. They argue that, although Æthelred was finally unsuccessful, he was not incompetent and there were important political and administrative developments in his reign. Stafford argues that his reign "is not a time of total failure and treachery; for the first twenty-five years or more Æthelred's reign follows normal tenth-century patterns". Cnut's biographer, Timothy Bolton, writes that "Æthelred appears to have been a strong and effective ruler", who was "powerless in the face of such strong and mobile forces". Keynes comments "Æthelred's misfortune as a ruler was owed not so much to any supposed defects of his imagined character, as to a combination of circumstances which anyone would have found difficult to control". In Keynes's view:

There were, it is true, always some who were both prepared and able to exploit a situation in their own interests, whether by persuading the king in his youth to appropriate property from religious houses, or latterly by perpetrating cowardly and treacherous acts for self-preservation at critical times, when the security of the country was seriously threatened and when the outcome of events was in the balance; and there can be no doubt that the closing years witnessed a military collapse that is as damning as it is understandable. But none of this should be allowed to detract from or overshadow the positive and enduring achievements of Æthelred's government, particularly in the last decade of the tenth and early years of the eleventh century, and it should not be forgotten that favourable conditions were created in this period for a remarkable flowering of intellectual activity and material culture.

Some historians are not convinced. Miller comments that in view of his early domination by bad councillors and later by Eadric Streona his nickname unræd seems well-deserved, and Cyril Hart disputes Keynes's assessment: "Those were the days when a king was expected to lead his nation, and this Æthelred failed conspicuously to do."

The military historian Richard Abels sees the payments of tribute as "expensive and ultimately futile appeasement", but does think that Æthelred was following grand strategy. He courted the dukes of Normandy in order to close their ports to Viking ships, and paid off some Norwegian Vikings and recruited others to defend his kingdom against attack by Danes. He also recruited Danish mercenaries. In Abels's view, Æthelred's policy of divide and rule was sensible. He undertook a programme of creating new fortified boroughs, refurbishing the defences of old ones, and strengthening the navy. Ultimately these measures failed, partly owing to the strength of the Viking armies and partly because of the "treachery and incompetence of the men whom Æthelred appointed to lead his armies". The tributes are often held up as displaying the weakness and incompetence of Æthelred's government, but Keynes points out that "the policy had been adopted in the past by Alfred the Great, Charles the Bald, and many others, and in certain circumstances may have seemed the best available way of protecting the people against loss of life, shelter, livestock, and crops. Though undeniably burdensome, it constituted a measure for which the king could rely on widespread support."

Three academic biographies of Æthelred have been published in the twenty-first century, by Ann Williams in 2003, Ryan Lavelle in 2008 and Levi Roach in 2016, and they have continued the partial rehabilitation of his reputation. In Lavelle's view, Æthelred had major achievements in the 990s, and his rule was moderately successful, but he lived too long: "Had he died in the early years of the eleventh century, then we might well remember a king of some competence". Williams writes:

The failures of Æthelred's kingship were political failures, an inability to control and direct the tensions and rivalries which arose between the royal councillors as they jockeyed for power. Æthelred's apparent inability to hold aloof from such conflicts may to some extent justify his reputation as unræd, though other aspects of his government show him amenable to good counsel as well as bad. Yet the first half of his reign can show successes as well as failures, and only in the last decade did matters go fatally awry. In a kingdom less focused on its king, his personal failings would have been less disastrous, but though England at the turn of the tenth and eleventh centuries was already a 'united kingdom', its unity was centred on and symbolized by the person of its king.

Roach comments that the picture in Æthelred's last years "is one of failure, but not of an inevitable or unmitigated one, and as elsewhere Æthelred's ongoing efforts to combat these threats deserve a sympathetic hearing". "Æthelred certainly measures up better to contemporary expectations of rule than his popular image would lead us to believe". "Indeed, despite his later reputation for inactivity, Æthelred was more than willing to apply himself when called for and it is above all variety which characterises his response to the Scandinavian threat". Lavelle observes that in his last years, his authority was collapsing, but he "simply proceeded with his appointed task of governing an ever-decreasing realm; the king could still muster his reserves of energy and surprise onlookers".

Roach does think that Æthelred is fairly criticised for his excessive support for and reliance on favourites, especially at the beginning and end of his rule. This may lie behind the demand for more just rule when he returned from exile after Swein's death. Roach describes Æthelred's life as a tragedy:

a tale of a ruler who despite energetic – and at times resourceful – efforts could not succeed in bringing his nation the "peace and victory"...they so desperately desired. Whether an Alfred the Great or a Charlemagne would have fared better in his shoes is an interesting question, but ultimately beside the point. What we can say is that Æthelred's reign was too long, too complex and too dynamic to dismiss him as "incompetent" or even "unready"; he deserves better, and so do we. Æthelred may not have been a great or even a good king, but he was not a hopeless one, and the Chronicle's own epitaph perhaps best sums up his reign: "he held the kingdom with great toil and hardship for the length of his life".

== Marriages and children ==
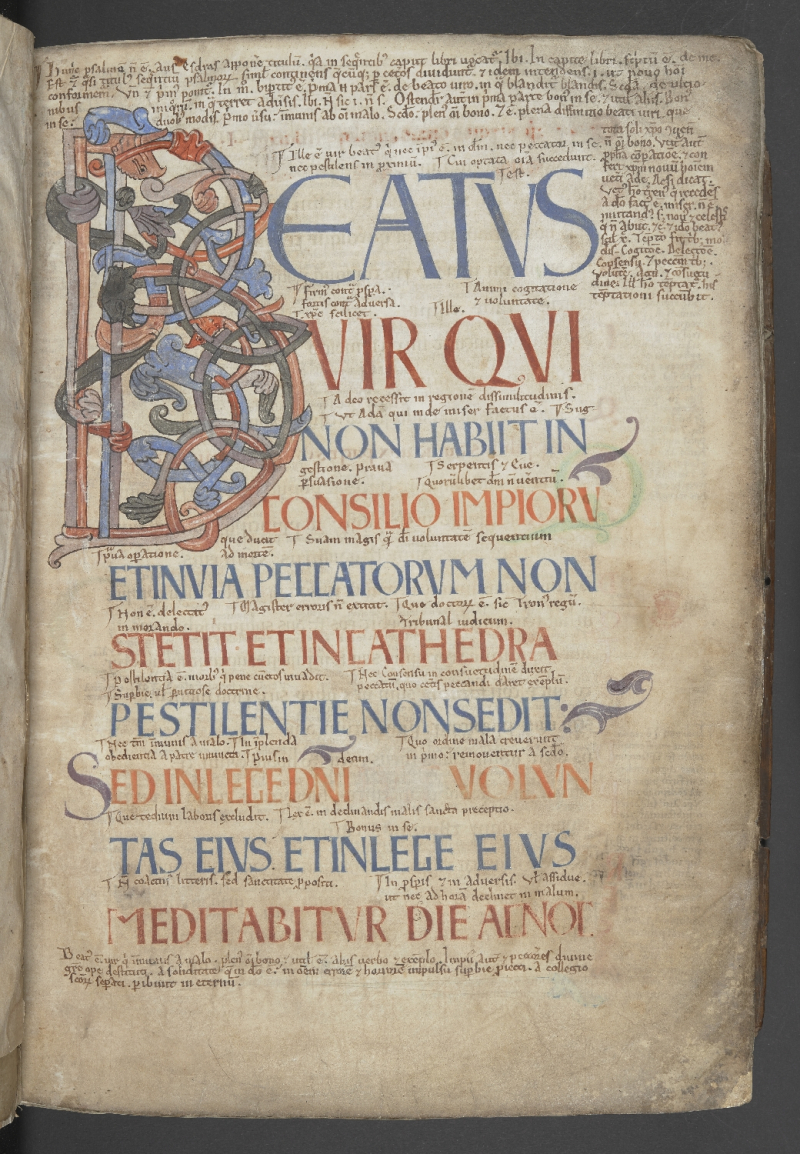
Illustration in the late tenth-century Bosworth Psalter, probably associated with Archbishop Dunstan

Æthelred probably married his first wife in the mid-980s as their oldest four sons (Æthelstan, Ecgberht, Edmund, Eadred) attest a charter dated 993. The fifth son, Eadwig, first attests in 997 and the sixth, Edgar, in 1001. They were named after Æthelred's recent predecessors, in historical order of their reigns, apart from Ecgberht, who interrupts the sequence, and his immediate predecessor, Edward the Martyr. Judging by the dates of their marriages, Æthelred's daughters by his first wife, Ælfgifu and Eadgyth, were born by the early 990s. His first wife is not recorded until after the Norman Conquest, and the information about her is limited and contradictory. According to the twelfth-century chronicler John of Worcester she was Ælfgifu, daughter of Ealdorman Æthelberht, but there was no ealdorman with that name. Another post-Conquest writer, Ailred of Rievaulx, does not name her, but states that her father was Thored, ealdorman of York, who did exist. Ailred served for a period in the household of King David I of Scotland, who was a descendant of Æthelred and his first wife, so he may have had access to reliable information. Combining these two sources, she may have been Ælfgifu, daughter of Thored. Williams comments that she seems to have been completely eclipsed by Ælfthryth, her mother-in-law.

=== Known children of Æthelred and his first wife ===
- Æthelstan Ætheling (died 1014)
- Ecgberht Ætheling (died c. 1005)
- Edmund Ironside (King of England, April to November 1016)
- Eadred Ætheling (died c. 1012)
- Eadwig Ætheling (killed on Cnut's order, 1017)
- Edgar Ætheling (died c. 1008)
- Ælfgifu (married Uhtred the Bold, ealdorman of Northumbria)
- Eadgyth (married Eadric Streona)

It is possible that John of Worcester and Ailred of Rievaulx were referring to different wives, and therefore that Æthelred married twice before wedding Emma. This suggestion is dismissed by Williams and Keynes, but is considered likely by Stafford.

=== Known children of Æthelred and Emma ===
In 1002 Æthelred married Emma, sister of Richard II, Duke of Normandy. Their children were:

- Edward the Confessor (King of England, 1042–1066)
- Alfred Ætheling (died 1036)
- Godgifu (married first Drogo of Mantes, second Eustace II of Boulogne)

=== Other possible daughters ===
Most authorities only recognise three daughters, but some list another two as possible.

- Wulfhild. According to the Supplement to the Jómsvíkinga Saga Wulfhild married Ufcytel, and he was killed by Thorkell the Tall, who then married Wulfhild. Most historians reject or ignore this suggestion, but she is accepted as a possible daughter of Ælfgifu by some historians.
- Abbess of Wherwell. According to ASC E, in 1051 Edward the Confessor rejected his wife and sent her to his sister, the abbess of Wherwell. Some genealogies list her as an unnamed daughter of Æthelred, and Stafford suggests that she may have been called Ælfthryth. It is possible that she was a daughter of Cnut, but in Stafford's view it is more likely that she was a daughter of Æthelred.

== See also ==
- Cultural depictions of Æthelred the Unready

== Sources ==
- Abels, Richard (1991). "English Tactics, Strategy and Military Organization in the Late Tenth Century". In Scragg, Donald (ed.). The Battle of Maldon AD 991. Oxford, UK: Basil Blackwell. pp. 143–155. ISBN 978-0-631-15987-2.
- Abels, Richard (2004). "Ulfcytel [Ulfcytel Snillingr] (d. 1016)". Oxford Dictionary of National Biography. Oxford University Press. doi:10.1093/ref:odnb/27984. (subscription, Wikipedia Library access or UK public library membership required)
- Aird, William (2004). "Uhtred, earl of Bamburgh (d. 1016)". Oxford Dictionary of National Biography. Oxford University Press. doi:10.1093/ref:odnb/27981. (subscription, Wikipedia Library access or UK public library membership required)
- Barlow, Frank (1979). The English Church 1000–1066 (2nd ed.). London: Longman. ISBN 978-0-582-49049-9.
- Barlow, Frank (1997). Edward the Confessor (New ed.). New Haven, Connecticut: Yale University Press. ISBN 978-0-300-07208-2.
- Bately, Janet, ed. (1986). The Anglo-Saxon Chronicle, A Collaborative Edition, 3, MS A. Cambridge: D. S. Brewer. ISBN 978-0-85991-103-0.
- Benham, Jenny (2020). "The Earliest Arbitration Treaty? A Reassessment of the Anglo-Norman Treaty of 991". Historical Research. 93 (260): 189–204. doi:10.1093/hisres/htaa001. ISSN 0950-3471.
- Blair, John (2005). The Church in Anglo-Saxon Society. Oxford, UK: Oxford University Press. ISBN 978-0-19-921117-3.
- Bolton, Timothy (2017). Cnut the Great. New Haven, Connecticut: Yale University Press. ISBN 978-0-300-20833-7.
- Brown, Michelle (2007). Manuscripts from the Anglo-Saxon Age. London, UK: The British Library. ISBN 978-0-7123-0680-5.
- Campbell, James (1978). "England, France, Flanders and Germany: Some Comparisons and Connections". In Hill, David (ed.). Ethelred the Unready. Oxford, UK: B.A.R. pp. 255–270. ISBN 978-0-86054-043-4.
- "Charter S 876". The Electronic Sawyer: Online Catalogue of Anglo-Saxon Charters. London: King's College London.
- "Charter S 893". The Electronic Sawyer: Online Catalogue of Anglo-Saxon Charters. London: King's College London.
- "Charter S 895". The Electronic Sawyer: Online Catalogue of Anglo-Saxon Charters. London: King's College London.
- "Charter S 905". The Electronic Sawyer: Online Catalogue of Anglo-Saxon Charters. London: King's College London.
- "Charter S 1503". The Electronic Sawyer: Online Catalogue of Anglo-Saxon Charters. London: King's College London.
- Cooper, Tracy-Anne (2015). Monk-Bishops and the English Benedictine Reform Movement. Toronto, Canada: Pontifical Institute of Mediaeval Studies. ISBN 978-0-88844-193-5.
- Cubbin, G. P., ed. (1996). The Anglo-Saxon Chronicle, A Collaborative Edition, 6, MS D. Cambridge, UK: D. S. Brewer. ISBN 978-0-85991-467-3.
- Cubitt, Catherine (2012). "The Politics of Remorse: Penance and Royal Piety in the Reign of Æthelred the Unready". Historical Research. 85 (228): 179–192. doi:10.1111/j.1468-2281.2011.00571.x. ISSN 0950-3471.
- de Laborderie, Olivier (2014). "The First Manuals of English History: Two Late Thirteenth-Century Genealogical Rolls of the Kings of England in the Royal Collection". Electronic British Library Journal: 1–25. doi:10.23636/1084. ISSN 1478-0259.
- Foot, Sarah (2011). "Æthelstan (Athelstan) (893/4–939), king of England". Oxford Dictionary of National Biography. Oxford University Press. doi:10.1093/ref:odnb/833. (subscription, Wikipedia Library access or UK public library membership required)
- Forte, Angelo; Oram, Richard; Pedersen, Frederik (2005). Viking Empires. Cambridge, UK: Cambridge University Press. ISBN 978-0-521-82992-2.
- Frank, Roberta (1994). "Cnut in the Verse of his Skalds". In Rumble, Alexander (ed.). The Reign of Cnut, King of England, Denmark and Norway. London, UK: Leicester University Press. pp. 106–124. ISBN 978-0-7185-0205-8.
- Garnett, George (1986). "Coronation and Propaganda: Some Implications of the Norman Claim to the Throne of England in 1066". Transactions of the Royal Historical Society. 36: 91–116. doi:10.2307/3679061. ISSN 0080-4401. JSTOR 3679061.
- Gillingham, John (April 1989). "'The Most Precious Jewel in the English Crown': Levels of Denegeld and Heregeld in the Early Eleventh Century". English Historical Review. 104 (411): 373–384. doi:10.1093/ehr/CIV.CCCCXI.373. ISSN 0013-8266.
- Hart, Cyril (1992). The Danelaw. London, UK: The Hambledon Press. ISBN 978-1-85285-044-9.
- Hart, Cyril (2007). "Edward [St Edward; called Edward the Martyr] (c. 962–978), king of England". Oxford Dictionary of National Biography. Oxford University Press. doi:10.1093/ref:odnb/8515. (subscription, Wikipedia Library access or UK public library membership required)
- Higham, Nicholas (1997). The Death of Anglo-Saxon England. Stroud, UK: Sutton Publishing. ISBN 978-0-7509-0885-6.
- Hudson, Alison (2018). "The Bosworth Psalter". In Breay, Claire; Story, Joanna (eds.). Anglo-Saxon Kingdoms: Art, Word, War. London, UK: British Library. pp. 242–243. ISBN 978-0-7123-5207-9.
- Hudson, John (2012). The Oxford History of the Laws of England Volume II 871–1216. Oxford, UK: Oxford University Press. ISBN 978-0-19-826030-1.
- Huscroft, Richard (2019). Making England 796-1042. Abingdon, UK: Routledge. ISBN 978-1-138-18246-2.
- Keynes, Simon (1978). "The Declining Reputation of King Æthelred the Unready". In Hill, David (ed.). Ethelred the Unready. Oxford, UK: B.A.R. pp. 227–253. ISBN 978-0-86054-043-4.
- Keynes, Simon (1980). The Diplomas of King Æthelred the Unready 978-1016. Cambridge, UK: Cambridge University Press. ISBN 978-0-521-02308-5.
- Keynes, Simon; Lapidge, Michael, eds. (1983). Alfred the Great: Asser's Life of King Alfred & Other Contemporary Sources. London: Penguin Classics. ISBN 978-0-14-044409-4.
- Keynes, Simon (1986). "A Tale of Two Kings: Alfred the Great and Æthelred the Unready". Transactions of the Royal Historical Society. Fifth Series 36. 36: 195–217. doi:10.2307/3679065. ISSN 0080-4401. JSTOR 3679065. S2CID 161932925.
- Keynes, Simon (2002). An Atlas of Attestations in Anglo-Saxon Charters, c. 670 – 1066. Cambridge, UK: Dept. of Anglo-Saxon, Norse, and Celtic, University of Cambridge, UK. ISBN 978-0-9532697-6-1.
- Keynes, Simon (2003). "Introduction". An Introduction to Anglo-Saxon England by Peter Hunter Blair with a New Introduction by Simon Keynes (3rd ed.). Cambridge: Cambridge University Press. pp. xi–xxxv. ISBN 978-0-521-83085-0.
- Keynes, Simon (2004). "Eadwig [Edwy] (c. 940–959)". Oxford Dictionary of National Biography. Oxford University Press. doi:10.1093/ref:odnb/8572. ISBN 978-0-19-861412-8. (subscription, Wikipedia Library access or UK public library membership required)
- Keynes, Simon (2009a). "Æthelred II [Ethelred; known as Ethelred the Unready] (c. 966x8–1016)". Oxford Dictionary of National Biography. Oxford University Press. doi:10.1093/ref:odnb/8915. (subscription, Wikipedia Library access or UK public library membership required)
- Keynes, Simon (2009b). "Edward the Ætheling". In Mortimer, Richard (ed.). Edward the Confessor: The Man and the Legend. Woodbridge, UK: The Boydell Press. pp. 42–62. ISBN 978-1-84383-436-6.
- Keynes, Simon (2012a). "The Cult of King Edward the Martyr during the Reign of King Æthelred the Unready". In Nelson, Janet; Reynolds, Susan; Johns, Susan (eds.). Gender and Historiography: Studies in the Earlier Middle Ages in Honour of Pauline Stafford. London, UK: University of London School of Advanced Study Institute of Historical Research. pp. 115–125. ISBN 978-1-905165-79-7.
- Keynes, Simon (2012b). "The Burial of King Æthelred the Unready at St Paul's". In Roffe, David (ed.). The English and their Legacy, 900-1200: Essays in Honour of Ann Williams. Woodbridge, UK: The Boydell Press. pp. 129–148. ISBN 978-1-84383-794-7.
- Keynes, Simon (2014a). "Anglo-Saxon Chronicle". In Lapidge, Michael; Blair, John; Keynes, Simon; Scragg, Donald (eds.). The Wiley Blackwell Encyclopedia of Anglo-Saxon England (2nd ed.). Chichester, West Sussex: Wiley Blackwell. pp. 37–39. ISBN 978-0-470-65632-7.
- Keynes, Simon (2014b). "Heregel ('army tax')". In Lapidge, Michael; Blair, John; Keynes, Simon; Scragg, Donald (eds.). The Wiley Blackwell Encyclopedia of Anglo-Saxon England (2nd ed.). Chichester, West Sussex: Wiley Blackwell. p. 240. ISBN 978-0-470-65632-7.
- Keynes, Simon (2014c). "Thegn". In Lapidge, Michael; Blair, John; Keynes, Simon; Scragg, Donald (eds.). The Wiley Blackwell Encyclopedia of Anglo-Saxon England (2nd ed.). Chichester, West Sussex: Wiley Blackwell. pp. 459–461. ISBN 978-0-470-65632-7.
- Knowles, David (1963). The Monastic Order in England: A History of its Development from the Times of St Dunstan to the Fourth Lateran Council 940-1216 (2nd ed.). Cambridge, UK: Cambridge University Press. OCLC 863305201.
- Lapidge, Michael, ed. (2009). Byrhtferth of Ramsey: The Lives of St Oswald and St Ecgwine (in Latin and English). Oxford: Clarendon Press. ISBN 978-0-19-955078-4.
- Lavelle, Ryan (2008). Aethelred II: King of the English 978–1016 (New ed.). Stroud, Gloucestershire: The History Press. ISBN 978-0-7524-4678-3.
- Lawson, M. K. (2011). Cnut: England's Viking King 1016–35 (2nd ed.). Stroud, UK: The History Press. ISBN 978-0-7524-6069-7.
- Leonardi, Claudio (1999). "Intellectual Life". In Reuter, Timothy (ed.). The New Cambridge Medieval History. Vol. III. Cambridge University Press. p. 191. ISBN 978-0-521-36447-8.
- Licence, Tom (2020). Edward the Confessor: Last of the Royal Blood. New Haven, Connecticut: Yale University Press. ISBN 978-0-300-21154-2.
- Maddicott, John (2010). The Origins of the English Parliament, 924–1327. Oxford, UK: Oxford University Press. ISBN 978-0-19-958550-2.
- Miller, Sean (2004). "Æthelred [Ethelred] I (d. 871)". Oxford Dictionary of National Biography. Oxford University Press. doi:10.1093/ref:odnb/8913. ISBN 978-0-19-861412-8. (subscription, Wikipedia Library access or UK public library membership required)
- Miller, Sean (2011). "Edward [called Edward the Elder] (870s?–924), king of the Anglo-Saxons". Oxford Dictionary of National Biography. Oxford University Press. doi:10.1093/ref:odnb/8514. (subscription, Wikipedia Library access or UK public library membership required)
- Miller, Sean (2014a). "Æthelred the Unready". In Lapidge, Michael; Blair, John; Keynes, Simon; Scragg, Donald (eds.). The Wiley Blackwell Encyclopedia of Anglo-Saxon England (2nd ed.). Chichester, West Sussex: Wiley Blackwell. pp. 16–17. ISBN 978-0-470-65632-7.
- Miller, Sean (2014b). "Edward the Martyr". In Lapidge, Michael; Blair, John; Keynes, Simon; Scragg, Donald (eds.). The Wiley Blackwell Encyclopedia of Anglo-Saxon England (2nd ed.). Chichester, West Sussex: Wiley Blackwell. pp. 167–168. ISBN 978-0-470-65632-7.
- Molyneaux, George (2015). The Formation of the English Kingdom in the Tenth Century. Oxford, UK: Oxford University Press. ISBN 978-0-19-871791-1.
- Mynors, R. A. B.; Thomson, R. M.; Winterbottom, M., eds. (1998). William of Malmesbury: Gesta Regum Anglorum, The History of the English Kings (in Latin and English). Vol. I. Oxford, UK: Clarendon Press. ISBN 978-0-19-820678-1.
- Naismith, Rory (2014). "Money". In Lapidge, Michael; Blair, John; Keynes, Simon; Scragg, Donald (eds.). The Wiley Blackwell Encyclopedia of Anglo-Saxon England (Second ed.). Chichester, West Sussex: Wiley Blackwell. pp. 329–30. ISBN 978-0-470-65632-7.
- Naismith, Rory (2017). Britain and Ireland c.400-1066. Medieval European Coinage: with a Catalogue of the Coins in the Fitzwilliam Museum, Cambridge. Vol. 8. Cambridge, UK: Cambridge University Press. ISBN 978-0-521-26016-9.
- Naismith, Rory (2019). Citadel of the Saxons: The Rise of Early London. London, UK: I. B. Tauris. ISBN 978-1-3501-3568-0.
- O'Brien O'Keeffe, Katherine, ed. (2001). The Anglo-Saxon Chronicle, A Collaborative Edition, 5, MS C. Cambridge: D. S. Brewer. ISBN 978-0-85991-491-8.
- Ozgar, moneyer. "First Hand coin of Æthelred II". Portable Antiquities Scheme.
- Poole, Russell (April 1987). "Skaldic Verse and Anglo-Saxon History: Some Aspects of the Period 1009-1016". Speculum. 62 (2): 265–298. doi:10.2307/2855227. ISSN 2040-8072. JSTOR 2855227.
- Ridyard, Susan (1988). The Royal Saints of Anglo-Saxon England. Cambridge, UK: Cambridge University Press. ISBN 978-0-521-30772-7.
- Roach, Levi (2016). Æthelred the Unready. New Haven, Connecticut: Yale University Press. ISBN 978-0-300-19629-0.
- Robertson, Agnes, ed. (1925). The Laws of the Kings of England from Edmund to Henry I. Cambridge, UK: Cambridge University Press. OCLC 271025606.
- Ryan, Martin (2013). "The Age of Æthelred". In Higham, Nicholas; Ryan, Martin (eds.). The Anglo-Saxon World. New Haven, Connecticut: Yale University Press. pp. 335–373. ISBN 978-0-300-12534-4.
- Sawyer, Peter (2013). The Wealth of Anglo-Saxon England. Oxford, UK: Oxford University Press. ISBN 978-0-19-925393-7.
- Stafford, Pauline (1978). "The Reign of Æthelred II, a Study in the Limitations on Royal Policy and Actions". In Hill, David (ed.). Ethelred the Unready. Oxford, UK: B.A.R. pp. 15–46. ISBN 978-0-86054-043-4.
- Stafford, Pauline (2001). "Political Ideas in Late Tenth-Century England: Charters as Evidence". In Stafford, Pauline; Nelson, Janet; Martindale, Jane (eds.). Law, Laity and Solidarities, Essays in Honour of Susan Reynolds. Manchester, UK: Manchester University Press. pp. 68–82. ISBN 978-0-7190-5836-3.
- Stafford, Pauline (2004). "Ælfthryth (d. 999x1001)". Oxford Dictionary of National Biography. Oxford University Press. doi:10.1093/ref:odnb/194. (subscription, Wikipedia Library access or UK public library membership required)
- Stafford, Pauline (2014). "Ealdorman". In Lapidge, Michael; Blair, John; Keynes, Simon; Scragg, Donald (eds.). The Wiley Blackwell Encyclopedia of Anglo-Saxon England (2nd ed.). Chichester, UK: Wiley Blackwell. pp. 156–157. ISBN 978-0-470-65632-7.
- Stafford, Pauline (2018). "Fathers and Daughters: The Case of Æthelred II". In Naismith, Rory; Woodman, David (eds.). Writing, Kingship and Power in Anglo-Saxon England. Cambridge, UK: Cambridge University Press. pp. 139–161. ISBN 978-1-108-74478-2.
- Stenton, Frank (1971). Anglo-Saxon England (3rd ed.). Oxford, UK: Oxford University Press. ISBN 978-0-19-821716-9.
- Turner, D. H. (1984). "Illuminated Manuscripts". In Backhouse, Janet; Turner, D. H.; Webster, Leslie (eds.). The Golden Age of Anglo-Saxon Art. Bloomington, Indiana: Indiana University Press. pp. 46–87. ISBN 978-0-253-21268-9.
- Whitelock, Dorothy, ed. (1930). Anglo-Saxon Wills. Cambridge, UK: Cambridge University Press. OCLC 786120891.
- Whitelock, Dorothy; Douglas, David; Tucker, Susie, eds. (1961). The Anglo-Saxon Chronicle. London, UK: Eyre and Spottiswoode. OCLC 317315404.
- Whitelock, Dorothy, ed. (1979). English Historical Documents, Volume 1, c. 500–1042 (2nd ed.). London, UK: Routledge. ISBN 978-0-415-14366-0.
- Williams, Ann (1999). Kingship and Government in Pre-Conquest England, c. 500-1066. Basingstoke, UK: Macmillan Press Ltd. ISBN 978-0-312-22090-7.
- Williams, Ann (2003). Æthelred the Unready: The Ill-Counselled King. London, UK: Hambledon and London. ISBN 978-1-85285-382-2.
- Williams, Ann (2004a). "Edmund I (920/21–946)". Oxford Dictionary of National Biography. Oxford University Press. doi:10.1093/ref:odnb/8501. ISBN 978-0-19-861412-8. (subscription, Wikipedia Library access or UK public library membership required)
- Williams, Ann (2004b). "Eadred [Edred] (d. 955)". Oxford Dictionary of National Biography. Oxford University Press. doi:10.1093/ref:odnb/8510. ISBN 978-0-19-861412-8. (subscription, Wikipedia Library access or UK public library membership required)
- Williams, Ann (2004c). "Ælfhere (d. 983)". Oxford Dictionary of National Biography. Oxford University Press. doi:10.1093/ref:odnb/182. (subscription, Wikipedia Library access or UK public library membership required)
- Williams, Ann (2004d). "Ælfric (d. 1016)". Oxford Dictionary of National Biography. Oxford University Press. doi:10.1093/ref:odnb/188. (subscription, Wikipedia Library access or UK public library membership required)
- Williams, Ann (2014). "Edgar (called Edgar Pacificus) (943/4–975)". Oxford Dictionary of National Biography. Oxford University Press. doi:10.1093/ref:odnb/8463. (subscription, Wikipedia Library access or UK public library membership required)
- Williamson, David (2002). The National Portrait Gallery History of the Kings and Queens of England (revised ed.). London, UK: National Portrait Gallery Publications. ISBN 978-1-85514-228-2.
- Wormald, Patrick (1978). "Aethelred the lawmaker". In David Hill (ed.). Ethelred the Unready: Papers from the Millenary Conference. British Archaeological Reports – British Series 59. Oxford, UK: B.A.R. pp. 47–80. ISBN 978-0-86054-043-4.
- Wormald, Patrick (1999). The Making of English Law: King Alfred to the Twelfth Century. Vol. 1. Oxford, UK: Blackwell. ISBN 978-0-631-13496-1.
- Yorke, Barbara (1988). "Æthelwold and the Politics of the Tenth Century". In Yorke, Barbara (ed.). Bishop Æthelwold: His Career and Influence. Woodbridge, UK: The Boydell Press. pp. 65–88. ISBN 978-0-85115-705-4.
- Yorke, Barbara (2004). "Æthelwold [St Æthelwold, Ethelwold] (904x9–984)". Oxford Dictionary of National Biography. Oxford University Press. doi:10.1093/ref:odnb/8920. (subscription, Wikipedia Library access or UK public library membership required)
- Yorke, Barbara (2008). "The Women in Edgar's Life". In Scragg, Donald (ed.). Edgar, King of the English 959–975. Woodbridge, UK: The Boydell Press. pp. 143–157. ISBN 978-1-84383-928-6.
- Yorke, Barbara (2014). "Council, King's". In Lapidge, Michael; Blair, John; Keynes, Simon; Scragg, Donald (eds.). The Wiley Blackwell Encyclopedia of Anglo-Saxon England (2nd ed.). Chichester, West Sussex: Wiley Blackwell. pp. 126–127. ISBN 978-0-470-65632-7.

Regnal titles
Preceded by Edward the Martyr	King of the English; 978–1013	Succeeded by Swein
Preceded by Swein	King of the English; 1014–1016	Succeeded by Edmund II
