= Eadred Ætheling =

Fourth of the six sons of King Æthelred the Unready

- Died: c. 1012
- House: House of Wessex
- Father: Æthelred the Unready
- Mother: Ælfgifu of York

Eadred Ætheling (Old English Eadred Æþeling) (died c. 1012) was the fourth of the six sons of King Æthelred the Unready by his first wife Ælfgifu. He witnessed charters between 993 and 1012 or 1013, but died before his father was forced to flee to Normandy in late 1013.

== See also ==
- House of Wessex family tree
