= Ælfgifu of York =

Queen of England (died c. 1001)

Queen consort of the English
- Tenure: c. 985 - c. 1001
- Died: c. 1001
- Spouse: Æthelred the Unready
- Issue: Æthelstan Ætheling; Ecgberht Ætheling; Edmund Ironside; Eadred Ætheling; Eadwig Ætheling; Edgar Ætheling; Ælfgifu; Eadgyth
- Father: Thored, Ealdorman of York

Ælfgifu of York (died c. 1001) was the first wife of Æthelred the Unready, King of the English. They had many children together, including Edmund Ironside. It is most probable that Ælfgifu was a daughter of Thored, Earl of southern Northumbria and his wife, Hilda.

== Identity and background ==
Her name and paternity do not surface in the sources until sometime after the Conquest. The first to offer any information at all, Sulcard of Westminster (fl. 1080s), merely describes her as being “of very noble English stock” (ex nobilioribus Anglis), without naming her, while in the early 12th century, William of Malmesbury has nothing to report. All primary evidence comes from two Anglo-Norman historians. John of Worcester, also writing in the early 12th century, states that Æthelred's first wife was Ælfgifu, daughter of the nobleman Æthelberht (comes Agelberhtus) and the mother of Edmund, Æthelstan, Eadwig and Eadgyth. Writing in the 1150s, Ailred of Rievaulx identifies her as a daughter of earl (comes) Thored and the mother of Edmund, though he supplies no name. Ailred had been seneschal at the court of King David I of Scotland (r. 1124–53), whose mother Margaret was a great-granddaughter of Ælfgifu. Although his testimony is late, his proximity to the royal family may have given him access to genuine information. Unlike Æthelred's mother, Ælfthryth, and his second wife, Emma of Normandy, Ælfgifu never attested any charters, an indication of her low status.

=== Problem of fatherhood ===
These two accounts are irreconcilable at the point of ascribing two different fathers to Æthelred's first wife (in both cases, Edmund's mother). One way out of it would be to assume the existence of two different wives before Æthelred's second wife, Emma, although this interpretation presents difficulties of its own, especially as the sources envisage a single woman. Historians generally favour the view that John of Worcester was in error about the father's name, as Æthelberht's very existence is under suspicion: if Latin comes is to be interpreted as a gloss on the office of ealdorman, only two doubtful references to one or two duces (ealdormen) of this name can be put forward that would fit the description. All in all, the combined evidence suggests that Æthelred's first wife was Ælfgifu, the daughter of Earl Thored. This magnate is likely to have been the Thored who was a son of Gunnar and earl of (southern) Northumbria.

== Marriage and children ==
Based largely on the careers of her sons, Ælfgifu's marriage has been dated approximately to the (mid-)980s. Considering Thored's authority as earl of York and apparently, the tenure of that office without royal appointment, the union would have signified an important step for the West-Saxon royal family by which it secured a foothold in the north. Such a politically weighty union would help explain the close connections maintained by Ælfgifu's eldest sons Edmund and Æthelstan with noble families based in the northern Danelaw.

The marriage produced six sons, all of whom were named after Æthelred's predecessors, and an unknown number of daughters. The eldest sons Æthelstan, Ecgberht, Eadred and Edmund first attest charters in 993, while the younger sons Eadwig and Edgar first make an appearance in them in 997 and 1001 respectively. Some of these sons seem to have spent part of their childhood in fosterage elsewhere, possibly with Æthelred's mother Ælfthryth.

Edmund Ironside outlived his father and became king. In 1016 he suffered several defeats against Cnut and in October they agreed to share the kingdom, but Edmund died within six weeks and Cnut became king of all England. Æthelred gave three of his daughters in marriage to ealdormen, presumably in order to secure the loyalties of his nobles and so to consolidate a defence system against Viking attacks.

=== Sons ===
- Æthelstan Ætheling (born before 993, d. 1014)
- Ecgberht (born before 993, d. 1005)
- Edmund (II) Ironside (born before 993, d. 1016)
- Eadred (d. 1012 x 1015)
- Eadwig (born before 997, exiled and killed 1017)
- Edgar (born before 1001, d. 1012 x 1015)

=== Daughters ===
- Eadgyth (born before 993), married Eadric Streona, ealdorman of Mercia.
- Ælfgifu, married ealdorman Uhtred of Northumbria.
- (possibly) Wulfhild, who married Ulfcytel (Snillingr) (d. 1016), apparently ealdorman of East Anglia.
- possible daughter, name unknown, who married the Æthelstan who was killed fighting the Danes at the Battle of Ringmere in 1010. He is called Æthelred's aðum, meaning either son-in-law or brother-in-law. Ann Williams, however, argues that the latter meaning is the appropriate one and refers to Æthelstan as being Ælfgifu's brother.
- possible daughter, name unknown, who became abbess of Wherwell.

== Sources ==
=== Primary sources ===
- Ailred of Rievaulx, De genealogia regum Anglorum ("On the Genealogy of the English Kings"), ed. R. Twysden, De genealogia regum Anglorum. Rerum Anglicarum scriptores 10. London, 1652. 1.347–70. Patrologia Latina 195 (711–38) edition available from Documenta Catholica; tr. M. L. Dutton and J. P. Freeland, Aelred of Rievaulx, The Historical Works. Kalamazoo, 2005.
- Anglo-Saxon Chronicle, ed. D. Dumville and S. Keynes, The Anglo-Saxon Chronicle: a collaborative edition. 8 vols. Cambridge, 1983
  - Tr. Michael J. Swanton, The Anglo-Saxon Chronicles. 2nd ed. London, 2000.
- John of Worcester, Chronicon ex Chronicis, ed. Benjamin Thorpe, Florentii Wigorniensis monachi chronicon ex chronicis. 2 vols. London, 1848–49
  - Tr. J. Stevenson, Church Historians of England. 8 vols.: vol. 2.1. London, 1855; pp. 171–372.
- Sulcard of Westminster, Prologus de construccione Westmonasterii, ed. B. W. Scholz, “Sulcard of Westminster. Prologus de construccione Westmonasterii.” Traditio; 20 (1964); pp. 59–91.
- William of Malmesbury, Gesta regum Anglorum, ed. and tr. R. A. B. Mynors, R. M. Thomson and M. Winterbottom, William of Malmesbury. Gesta Regum Anglorum: The History of the English Kings. (Oxford Medieval Texts.) 2 vols.; vol 1. Oxford, 1998.

=== Secondary sources ===
- Fryde, E. et al. Handbook of British Chronology. 3d ed. Cambridge, 1996.
- Keynes, Simon. “Æthelred II (c.966x8–1016).” Oxford Dictionary of National Biography. Oxford University Press, 200.4 Accessed 1 Sept 2007.
- Roach, Levi (2016). Æthelred the Unready. New Haven, Connecticut: Yale University Press. ISBN 978-0-300-19629-0.
- Stafford, Pauline. "The Reign of Æthelred II. A Study in the Limitations on Royal Policy and Action." In Ethelred the Unready. Papers from the Millenary Conference, ed. D. Hill. BAR British series 59. Oxford, 1978. 15–46.
- Stafford, Pauline. Queen Emma and Queen Edith: Queenship and Women’s Power in Eleventh-Century England. Oxford, 1997.
- Trow, M.J. Cnut: Emperor of the North. Sutton, 2005.
- Williams, Ann. Æthelred the Unready: The Ill-Counselled King. London, 2003.

Preceded by Ælfthryth	Queen consort of the English; 980s–1002	Succeeded by Emma of Normandy
