= Cultural depictions of Æthelred the Unready =

Cultural depictions of the English king Æthelred the Unready have generally been less than flattering. Many of these portrayals are based on legendary material about the king written by later scribes such as William of Malmesbury.

== Cultural references ==
Æthelred was the subject of a stageplay by Ronald Ribman titled The Ceremony of Innocence which was made into a film by the same name. It was first performed in 1968, and depicted interactions between Æthelred and his court, family and advisors, and also with the Danish king, Sweyn Forkbeard. Æthelred was portrayed by Richard Kiley in both play and film.

Æthelred is also referenced in Robert Asprin's 1981 comic fantasy novel Myth Conceptions as a fictitious author of the epigraph to Chapter 4: "If the proper preparations have been made and the necessary precautions taken, any staged event is guaranteed success" - Ethelred the Unready

Æthelred is also the subject of Richard Edward Wilson's Æthelred the Unready, a comical one-act opera composed in 1992.

He is also referenced in the Sid Meier's Civilization franchise of computer games, occupying the second lowest rank that a player may earn upon the game's completion, just above Dan Quayle.

Æthelred is also featured in the historical novel A Hollow Crown: The Story of Emma, Queen of Saxon England (2004, also published as The Forever Queen) by Helen Hollick. The protagonist is his wife Emma of Normandy. The novel opens with the wedding of 13-year-old Emma to Æthelred, a 34-year-old man with a grown son of his own. The early years of their marriage are barren, and Æthelred considers ending said marriage. He is then depicted in a "drunken fury", first killing Emma's dog, then engaging in a night of domestic violence and marital rape. Edward the Confessor is depicted as the result of that night, unloved by his own mother.

Æthelred is a recurring character in Vikings: Valhalla, portrayed by Bosco Hogan.

Additionally, he is featured throughout Ken Follett's novel The Evening and the Morning. His character is shown favorably as he grants the future town of Kingsbridge its bridge and supports one of the protagonists' claims to her dowry.
