= Æthelstan Ætheling =

Eldest son of King Æthelred the Unready

- Born: c. 980s
- Died: 25 June 1014
- Burial: Old Minster, Winchester
- House: Wessex
- Father: Æthelred the Unready
- Mother: Ælfgifu of York

Æthelstan Ætheling (Old English: Æþelstan Æþeling; early or mid 980s – 25 June 1014) was the eldest son of King Æthelred the Unready by his first wife Ælfgifu, and was the heir apparent to the kingdom until his death. (Note: Frank Barlow thinks that 1012 is more probable as the year of death, but Dorothy Whitelock and Simon Keynes argue that Æthelstan must have died in 1014.) He is first mentioned as a witness to a charter of his father in 993. He probably spent part of his childhood at Æthelingadene, Dean in west Sussex, and his paternal grandmother Ælfthryth may have played an important part in his upbringing. Almost nothing is known of his life, although he seems to have formed a friendship with Sigeforth and Morcar, two of the leading thegns of the Five Boroughs of the East Midlands.

In December 1013 the Danish king Sweyn conquered England and King Æthelred was forced into exile in Normandy, but he returned following Sweyn's death in February 1014. It is not known what became of Æthelstan and his surviving full brothers, Edmund Ironside and Eadwig, during Sweyn's rule, but they probably remained somewhere in England. Æthelstan's last mention in a charter is in one dated 1013.

Æthelstan was a "warrior prince"; and by his death he had accumulated a large collection of swords, prized war horses and combat equipment. In his will, made on the day of his death, copies of which still survive, he left Edmund Ironside his most prized possession, a sword which had once belonged to Offa of Mercia, together with some of his estates and other pieces of his war gear. To his other full brother, Eadwig, he gave another piece from his large weapon collection, a silver-hilted sword. Much of his remaining land and wealth was divided between churches, friends and servants. He also made bequests to his sword-polisher and his stag huntsman.

While he mentions his father, grandmother and foster-mother in his will, his own mother and her soul are completely omitted. He also makes no mention of his stepmother or half-brothers, suggesting a division within the royal family at the time. He was buried at the Old Minster, Winchester, the first burial there of someone who was not king since Edward the Elder's brother, Æthelweard, in 922.

== Sources ==
- Barlow, Frank (1997). Edward the Confessor (New ed.). New Haven, Connecticut: Yale University Press. ISBN 978-0-300-07208-2.
- Keynes, Simon (1980). The Diplomas of King Æthelred the Unready 978-1016. Cambridge, UK: Cambridge University Press. ISBN 978-0-521-02308-5.
- Keynes, Simon (2004). "Æthelstan Ætheling [Athelstan the Atheling] (d. 1014)". Oxford Dictionary of National Biography. Oxford University Press. doi:10.1093/ref:odnb/39127. (subscription, Wikipedia Library access or UK public library membership required)
- Stafford, Pauline (2001). Queen Emma and Queen Edith (paperback ed.). Oxford, UK: Blackwell. ISBN 978-0-631-16679-5.
- Whitelock, Dorothy, ed. (1979). "129. Old English will of the Atheling Athelstan, eldest son of King Ethelred (1014)". English Historical Documents, Volume 1, c. 500–1042 (2nd ed.). London, UK: Routledge. pp. 593–596. ISBN 978-0-415-14366-0.
