= Eadwig Ætheling =

Fifth of the six sons of King Æthelred the Unready

- Died: 1017
- Burial: Tavistock Abbey
- House: House of Wessex
- Father: Æthelred the Unready
- Mother: Ælfgifu of York

Eadwig Ætheling (sometimes also known as Eadwy or Edwy) (died 1017) was the fifth of the six sons of King Æthelred the Unready and his first wife, Ælfgifu. Eadwig is recorded as a witness to charters from 993.

When Sweyn Forkbeard conquered England in 1013, Æthelred fled to Normandy, but Eadwig, who had previously rarely been associated with his elder brothers, Æthelstan Ætheling and Edmund Ironside, remained behind with them in England. Sweyn died in February 1014, and Æthelred was restored to the throne. Æthelstan died in June 1014 and Æthelred in April 1016, leaving Edmund and Sweyn's son Cnut to dispute the throne. In October 1016 Cnut and Edmund agreed to divide England between them, but Edmund died a month later, leaving Cnut as undisputed king.

Eadwig, who was now the last surviving son by his father's first marriage, was banished in 1016 and then outlawed in 1017 by Cnut, however he was reconciled with Cnut the same year and allowed to live in England, but was murdered soon after at the instigation of Cnut, possibly after attempting to rally resistance in the south west. The Anglo-Saxon claim to the throne then passed to the elder son of Æthelred's second marriage, the future Edward the Confessor. Eadwig was buried at Tavistock Abbey in Devon, a place built by his uncle Ordwulf.

== See also ==
- House of Wessex family tree
