= John Hudson (historian) =

English medieval historian (born 1962)

Professor John Hudson FBA FRSE FRHistS
- Born: 7 May 1962 (age 64)
- Occupations: Historian and academic

Academic background
- Education: Worcester College, Oxford; University of Toronto
- Thesis: Legal aspects of seignorial control of land in the century after the Norman Conquest (1988)

Academic work
- Discipline: History
- Sub-discipline: Early medieval history; History of Anglo-Saxon England; Legal history
- Institutions: University of St Andrews; University of Michigan Law School

John Geoffrey Henry Hudson (born 7 May 1962) is an English medieval historian and Latin translator. He is Professor of Legal History at the University of St Andrews and the William W. Cook Global Law Professor at the University of Michigan Law School. He was educated at Worcester College, Oxford (M.A. and D.Phil.) and the University of Toronto (M.A.).

Hudson specializes in Medieval (particularly Anglo-Norman) legal history. He is the author of The Oxford History of the Laws of England Volume II 871–1216. He is also known for his monographs on the subject, especially on Anglo-Norman land law, as well as his edition, translation and commentary of the Historia Ecclesie Abbendonensis. In 2006, he gave the Selden Society lecture to mark the centenary of F.W. Maitland's passing. In addition to scholarly books, chapters, articles and lectures, Hudson has also contributed to The Times Literary Supplement.

Hudson was elected a Fellow of the Royal Society of Edinburgh in 2014. In 2016, Hudson was elected to the British Academy.

== Books ==
- Land, Law, and Lordship in Anglo-Norman England (Oxford, 1994)
- The Formation of the English Common Law (London, 1996)
- "Pollock and Maitland": Centenary Essays on the "History of English Law" (Proceedings of the British Academy (89; 1996) (Hudson was editor)
- The History of the Church of Abingdon, 2 vols, (Oxford, 2002 and 2007)
- F. W. Maitland and the Englishness of English Law (Selden Society Lecture for 2006:published 2008)
- The Oxford History of the Laws of England Volume II 871–1216 (Oxford, 2012)

== In popular culture ==
In a 2006 poll by BBC History magazine for "worst Briton" of the previous millennium, Hudson's nominee for worst Briton of the 12th century, the murdered Archbishop of Canterbury Saint Thomas Becket, came second behind Jack the Ripper. The poll was dismissed as "daft" in The Guardian, and the result disputed by Anglicans and Catholics. Historians had nominated one person per century, and for the 12th century John Hudson chose Becket for being "greedy", "hypocritical", "founder of gesture politics" and "master of the soundbite". The BBC website also quoted Hudson as saying "Those who share my prejudice against Becket may consider his assassination ... a fittingly grisly end." The BBC History magazine editor suggested most other nominees were too obscure for voters.
