= Agnes Jane Robertson =

English historian (1893–1959)

Agnes Jane Robertson M.A. PhD (1893–1959) was a British historian of Anglo-Saxon England. She was a student of Hector Munro Chadwick in the Department of Anglo-Saxon and Kindred Studies at the University of Cambridge, matriculating in about 1918. She was a Pfeiffer Research Fellow of Girton College, Cambridge and a lecturer in the Department of Anglo-Saxon and Kindred Studies between 1932 and 1935. She was later a reader in English language at the University of Aberdeen, which gives the Agnes Jane Robertson Memorial Lecture in her honour.

Robertson edited and translated two volumes of Anglo-Saxon documents, The Laws of the Kings of England from Edmund to Henry I, published in 1925, and Anglo-Saxon Charters, in 1939, with a second edition in 1956. A facsimile reprint was published in 2009.
