= Manor of Orleigh =

Historic manor in Devon, England

Coordinates: 50.9783°N 4.2382°W

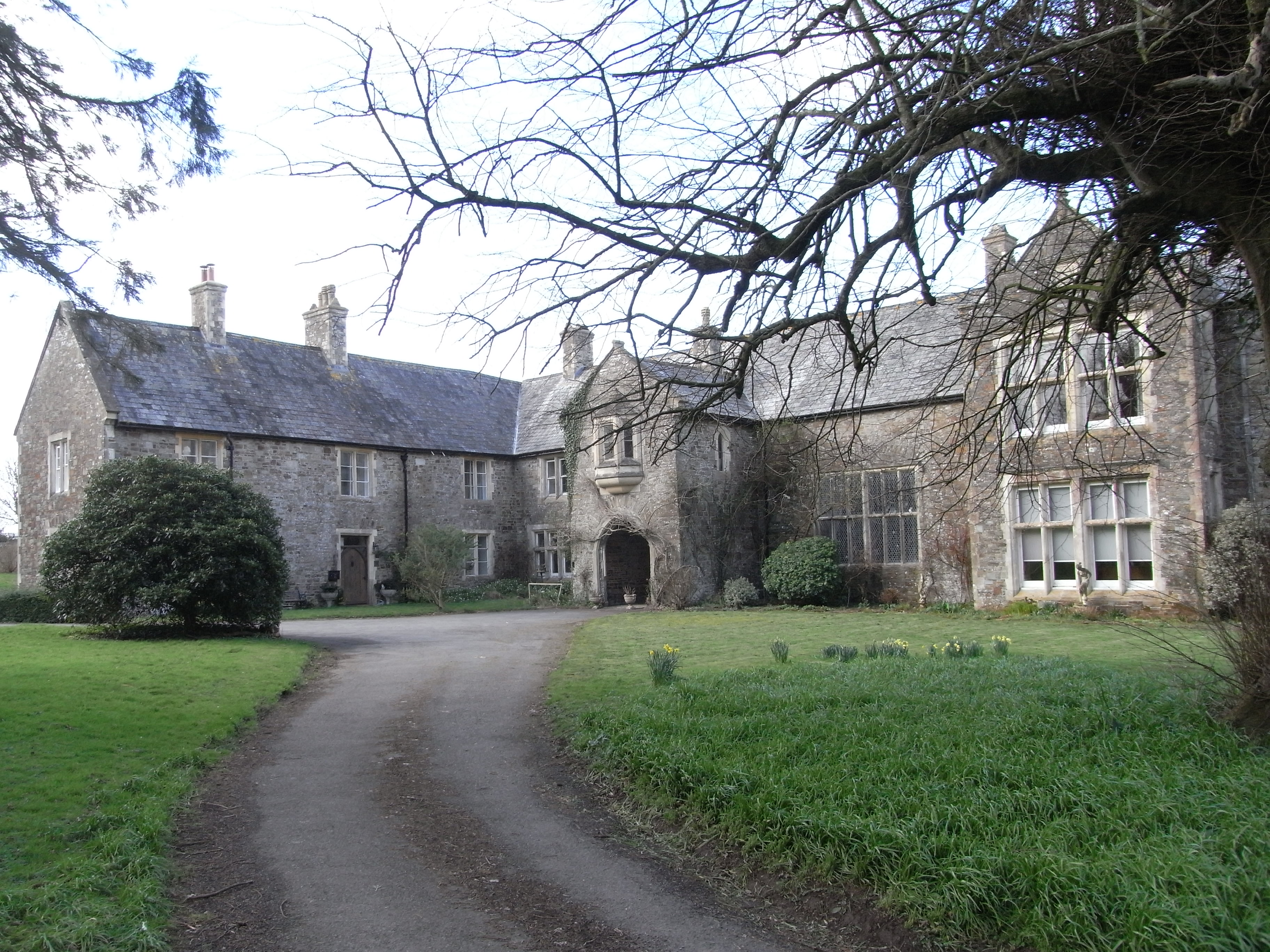
Orleigh Court, in Buckland Brewer parish, North Devon

Orleigh is a historic manor in the parish of Buckland Brewer, situated 4 miles to the south west of Bideford, North Devon, England. The manor house is known as Orleigh Court.

== Descent of the manor ==
=== Ordulf the Saxon ===
In the 10th century the manor of "Orlege" was one of the holdings of the Anglo-Saxon Ordwulf (died after 1005), son of Ordgar (d.971), Ealdorman of Devon under King Edgar (ruled 959-975). Ordgar planned for the founding of Tavistock Abbey in 961 which his son Ordwulf put into effect. He held the manor by right of his wife Abina, and in 975 gave it as an endowment to Tavistock Abbey. Ordwulf's holding of Orleigh was recorded in an ancient cartulary of Tavistock Abbey, now lost, but quoted from by Dugdale (d.1686) in his Monasticon Anglicanum.

=== Tavistock Abbey ===
The manor is not listed in Domesday Book of 1086, but may have been included for administrative purposes in the nearby manor of Abbotsham, which is listed in Domesday Book, held also by Tavistock Abbey. Orleigh next appears in a charter of Pope Celestine III dated 1193 confirming it to the Abbey.

=== Denys ===
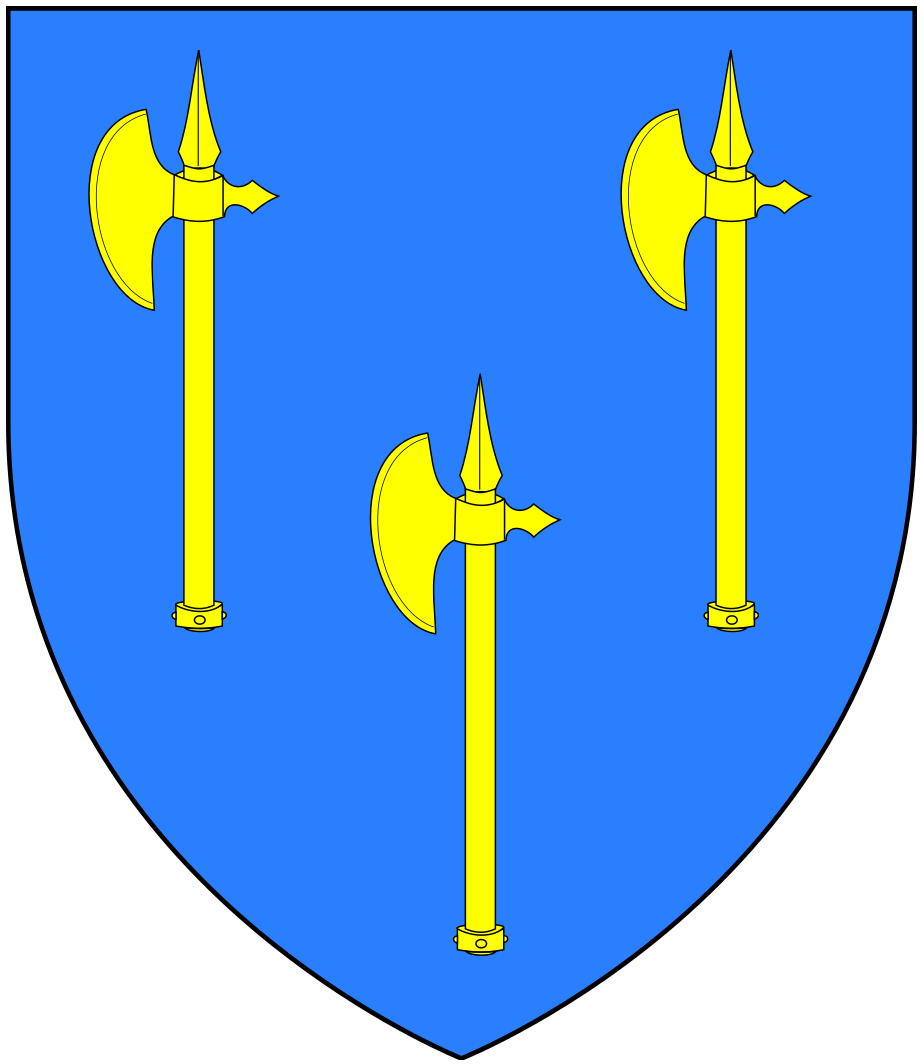
Arms of Denys of Orleigh: Azure, three Danish battle axes erect or, as seen on ledger stone of Elizabeth Denys (1625-1664) on floor of Orleigh Chapel, Buckland Brewer Church, Devon

The Denys family were for many centuries the feudal tenants of Orleigh under the overlordship of Tavistock Abbey until 1538, when the abbey was dissolved in the Dissolution of the Monasteries. They continued to hold it thereafter, under the overlordship of the Russell family, Earls of Bedford, who had acquired the abbey and its lands at the Dissolution. The descent of Denys of Orleigh is as follows:

- Josceline le Deneys (whose first name was Latinised to Jollenus, Jellanus or Joscelinus) was recorded in the 1166 Cartae Baronum return submitted by Henry de Pomeroy, feudal baron of Berry Pomeroy in South Devon, as holding from him the manor of Pancrasweek, Black Torrington hundred, North Devon, and de Pomeroy himself held it from Tavistock Abbey. This Jollenus Dacus held Pancrasweek as one knight's fee on military feudal tenure. Orleigh formed a sub-manor of Pancrasweek, but was held by him under the non-military tenure of free socage, that is to say it was a heritable estate the service for which was monetary not military. Dacus held two fees in total from de Pomeroy, as stated in his 1166 return.
- Ralph Denys (son) of Orleigh and Pancrasweek, living during the reign of King Henry II (1154-1189)
- William I Denys
- Jellanus II Denys
- Robert le Deneys. In the feudal aid of 1285 he is recorded as holding one knight's fee in Pancrasweek, half a fee at Southwick in Germansweek and half in Manaton (14 miles north of Berry Pomeroy Castle). In 1285 however Robert le Deneys was holding these manors not from the de Pomeroy barons but from the heirs of Patrick de Chaworth, who was successor in title to Brewer, lord of the manor of Buckland Brewer amongst others, who had himself purchased them from de Pomeroy.
- William II le Deneys (younger son), to whom Robert le Deneys gave Orleigh.
- John I le Deneys (son), in possession of Orleigh in 1342
- Henry Denys (son)
- Richard Denys (died 1442) (son), who married Elizabeth Bowhay, daughter and heiress of Geoffrey Bowhay of Bowhay. In 1417 Orleigh was occupied by his wife's cousin, also called Elizabeth Bowhay, the daughter of John Bowhay and widow of Thomas Crydia. She was granted in 1417 by Edmund Stafford (died 1419), Bishop of Exeter, licence to have mass performed in her oratory at Orleigh.
- John II Denys (son), who married Joan Esse, daughter and heiress of William Esse (alias Ash, see Ashreigney, etc.)
- John III Denys (son), who married Joan Thorne, daughter of Thomas Thorne
- John IV Denys (d.1498) (son), who married Eleanor Gifford, daughter and co-heiress of Stephen Gifford of Theoborough. His daughter Elizabeth Denys was the first wife of John Basset (1462–1528) of Umberleigh, Devon, and her monumental brass effigy survives on his chest tomb in Atherington Church.
- William III Denys (son), Sheriff of Devon in 1466, who married Anne Stucley, daughter of Nicholas Stucley (born 1451) lord of the manor of Affeton, Devon, by his wife Anne Pomeroy, daughter of Edward Pomeroy (d.1446), feudal baron of Berry Pomeroy, Sheriff of Devon in 1431.
- Nicholas Denys (son), who married Philippa Sydenham, daughter of John Sydenham of Orchard Sydenham in Somerset.
- John V Denys (died 1584) (son), who married Dorothy Monck, a daughter of Anthony Monk (d.1545) of Potheridge, Devon, great-great-grandfather of George Monck, 1st Duke of Albemarle (1608-1670).
- William Denys (died 1605) (son). In 1573 he married Mary Vyell, daughter of William Vyell of Trevorder. As part of the marriage settlement his father settled onto the issue of the marriage the reversion of his manor of Farley in Petrockstowe. William contributed £25 to the defences against the Spanish Armada in 1588. He died intestate.
- Anthony Dennis (1585–1641) (son), the last of the male line, whose monument survives in St Mary's Church, Buckland Brewer.

==== Anthony Dennis (1585–1641) ====
Anthony Dennis married twice:

- First in 1610 to Elizabeth Wise (d.1623), daughter of Thomas Wise (1546-1593) of Sydenham, Devon. They had a son William (born 1611), who predeceased his father, and two daughters who died young.
- Second, to Gertrude Grenville, daughter of Sir Bernard Grenville (1567-1636), lord of the manors of Bideford, the seaport 4 miles north of Orleigh, and of nearby Stowe, in the parish of Kilkhampton, Cornwall. Sir Bernard was the son of the renowned Sir Richard Grenville (1542–1591), Captain of "The Revenge" which was lost heroically fighting the Spaniards in the Azores, and the father of the renowned Sir Bevil Grenville (1596–1643) killed in heroic circumstances during the Civil War at the Battle of Lansdowne leading the Cornish Pikemen, memorialized by Sir Bevil Grenville's Monument on Lansdowne Hill near Bath, whose son was John Grenville, 1st Earl of Bath (1628-1701). They had eight children, of whom only three infant daughters, aged between 8 and 14, survived their father as co-heiresses:
  - Mary Dennis, the eldest, who married Sir Thomas Hampson, 2nd Baronet (died 1670), of Taplow, Buckinghamshire.
  - Elizabeth Dennis (died 1664), who married twice, firstly in 1643 to John Hern and secondly to William Alston of Strixton, Northamptonshire. A slab exists on the floor of the Orleigh Chapel showing the arms of Alston impaling Dennis, inscribed thus: "In memory of Elizabeth Alston, daughter of Anthony Dennis of Orleigh Esqr., the wife of William Alston of Strixton in the county of Northampton, Esqr., who in sure and certain assurance of a (?) life departed ye 4th of June 1664".
  - Gertrude Dennis, the youngest, who in 1664 married Nicholas Glynne of Glynne in Cornwall.

In 1661 the three sisters conveyed jointly the manor of Orleigh to feoffees who sold it in 1684 to the Bideford tobacco merchant John I Davie (died 1710).

=== Davie ===
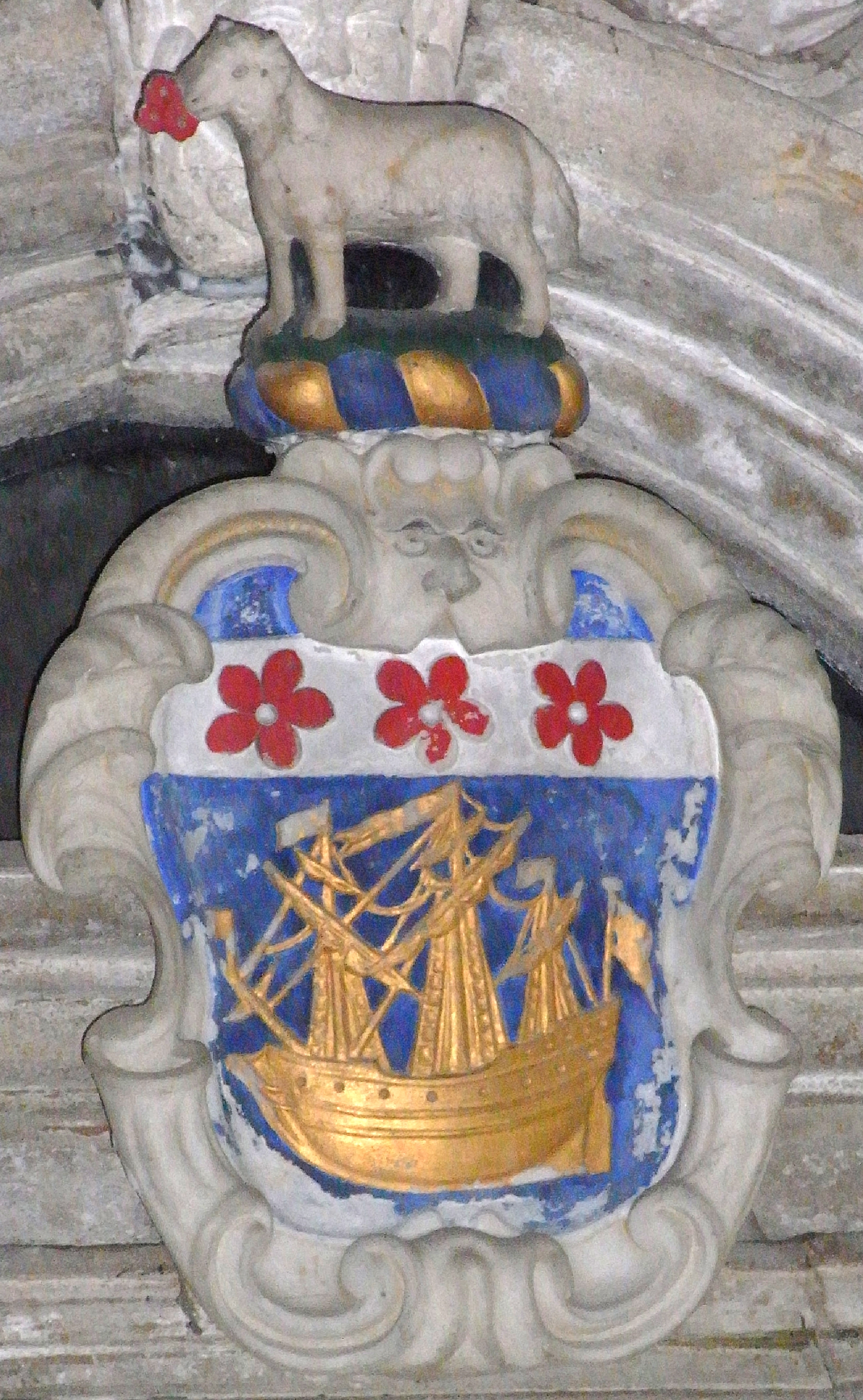
Arms of John Davie (died 1710) of Orleigh Court, above the Davie mural monument in Buckland Brewer Church, North Devon

- John I Davie (d.1710), a prominent tobacco merchant from Bideford, who acquired Orleigh in 1684.
- Joseph Davie (d.1723), (son), who married Juliana Pryce (d.1720), daughter of Sir John Pryce, 1st Baronet (ca. 1596–ca. 1657), MP, of Newtown in Montgomery, Wales. She died of smallpox. Juliana's husband carried out much rebuilding work to Orleigh Court and the arms of Davie impaling Pryce (Gules, a lion rampant regardant or) survive on several elaborately decorated lead hopper-heads forming part of the roof guttering.
- John II Davie (d.1761), (son) who married twice, firstly to Juliana Musgrave, daughter of Richard Musgrave of Stone, Somerset, by whom he had issue; secondly (as her second husband) to Mary Courtenay (d.1754), a daughter of Sir William Courtenay, 2nd Baronet (1675-1735) of Powderham, Devon, without issue.
- John III Davie (d.1793), (son) who in 1763 married his step-first cousin Eleanora Basset (1741-1800), daughter of John Basset (1714-1758) lord of the manors of Umberleigh and Heanton Punchardon, by his wife Eleanor Courtenay (d.1765), a daughter of Sir William Courtenay, 2nd Baronet (1675-1735). Eleanora Basset was in her issue the heiress of her childless brother Col. Francis Basset (c.1740-1802), of Heanton Court.
- Joseph Davie Basset (1764-1846), (son), who inherited the Basset estates from his uncle, and in accordance with the terms of the bequest adopted by royal licence the surname and arms of Basset. He married Mary Irwin (1777-1862) of Barnstaple. He disentailed Orleigh in 1793 and sold it to Charles Luxmore in 1807. In 1825 he commenced building Watermouth Castle within the Basset manor of Berrynarbor.
- Arthur Davie Basset (1801-1870), (son), who married Harriet Sarah Crawfurth (1806-1863), daughter of Thomas Smith Crawfurth of Dulverton in Somerset.

=== Lee ===
Charles Luxmore transferred Orleigh to Major Edward Lee (died 1819), whose heir was his infant nephew John Hanning. Hanning assumed the name Lee, as he was required to do under his uncle's will, and purchased as his residence Dillington Manor near Ilminster in Somerset. He let Orleigh to his brother-in-law William Speke of Jordans near Ilminster, Somerset. Speke had seven children, all but one daughter having been born at Orleigh, including his eldest son the famous explorer and discoverer of the source of the River Nile, John Hanning Speke (1827–1864).

=== Rogers ===
The Speke family gave up their tenancy of Orleigh in 1845 and Mr Lee next let the house to Col. Bayly from 1845 to 1856 and then to Capt. Audley Mervyn-Archdale from 1856 to 1869. In 1869 he sold Orleigh to Thomas Rogers, whose descendant was W.H. Rogers, M.A., F.S.A., the historian of Orleigh and Buckland Brewer, who published his work "Buckland Brewer" in 1938.

== Sources ==
- Pole, Sir William (d.1635), Collections Towards a Description of the County of Devon, Sir John-William de la Pole (ed.), London, 1791
- Risdon, Tristram (1811). Rees; et al., eds. The Chorographical Description or Survey of the County of Devon (updated ed.). Plymouth: Rees and Curtis.
- Rogers, W.H., "Buckland Brewer", first published 1938, reprinted 2000, Snetzler, M.F. (Ed.), Barcott, Buckland Brewer
- Thorn, Caroline and Frank (1985). Domesday Book 9: Devon. Parts 1 & 2. Chichester: Phillimore. ISBN 0-85033-492-6.
- Vivian, J.L., ed. (1895). The Visitations of the County of Devon, Comprising the Heralds' Visitations of 1531, 1564, & 1620. With additions by Lieutenant-Colonel J. L. Vivian. Exeter: Henry S. Eland.
