= Dead Man's Plack =

Monument to Æthelwald, Ealdorman of East Anglia

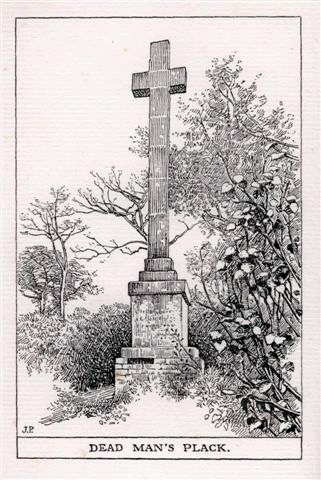
- Illustration from Dead Man's Plack and an Old Thorn by William Henry Hudson
- Interactive map of Dead Man's Plack
- Location: Longparish, Hampshire, England
- Coordinates: 51.2012°N 1.4275°W
- Type: Cross
- Material: Stone
- Completion date: 1825
- Dedicated to: Earl Athelwold of Wherwell

Dead Man's Plack is a Grade-II listed 19th-century monument to Æthelwold, Ealdorman of East Anglia, who, according to legend, was killed in 963 near the site where it stands by his rival in love, King Edgar I.

The monument was erected in 1825 at Harewood Forest, between the villages of Picket Twenty and Longparish, Hampshire, by Lt Col William Iremonger.

== Description ==
The monument consists of a stone cross on a pedestal with plain unmoulded details. On its south side an inscription in Gothic script reads:

About the year of our Lord DCCCCLXIII upon this spot beyond the time of memory called Deadman's Plack, tradition reports that Edgar, surnamed the peaceable, King of England, in the ardour of youth love and indignation, slew with his own hand his treacherous and ungrateful favourite, owner of this forest of Harewood, in resentment of the Earl's having basely betrayed and perfidiously married his intended bride and beauteous Elfrida, daughter of Ordgar, Earl of Devonshire, afterwards wife of King Edgar, and by him mother of King Ethelred II. Queen Elfrida, after Edgar's death, murdered his eldest son, King Edward the Martyr, and founded the Nunnery of Wor-well.

An inscription on the north side of the plinth reads: "This Monument was erected by Col William Iremonger AD MDCCCXXV".

== Legend ==
According to legend, King Edgar I sent his "favourite and most trusted" earl, Æthelwold, to meet Ælfthryth, daughter of Ordgar, the Earl of Devonshire, to assess her suitability as a bride. On meeting her, Æthelwald was "smitten with her beauty" and married her himself. Æthelwald then returned to the king and told him that she was "a girl of vulgar and common place appearance, and by no means worthy" of the king's hand, while concealing his own marriage to her. Discovering the deception through court gossip, Edgar swore vengeance and arranged a hunt in the Harewood Forest to which he invited Æthelwald. During the hunt, Edgar murdered Æthelwald with a javelin, and subsequently took Ælfthryth as his wife and queen.

== Historical basis ==
The story of Æthelwald's murder was first described by William of Malmesbury, a 12th-century historian, in his Gesta regum Anglorum ("Deeds of the kings of the English"; 1125). William's account was later repeated by David Hume (1711–1776), a Scottish historian, philosopher, economist, diplomat and essayist, in his 6-volume work The History of England, published between 1754–1761. Thomas Babington Macaulay (1800–1859), in his preface to Lays of Ancient Rome (1842), says the story has "a most suspicious air of romance" and "greatly resembles" some of the legends of early Rome. Macaulay writes: "when we turn to William of Malmesbury, we find that Hume, in his eagerness to relate these pleasant fables, has overlooked one very important circumstance. William does indeed tell both the stories; but he gives us distinct notice that he does not warrant their truth, and that they rest on no better authority than that of ballads."

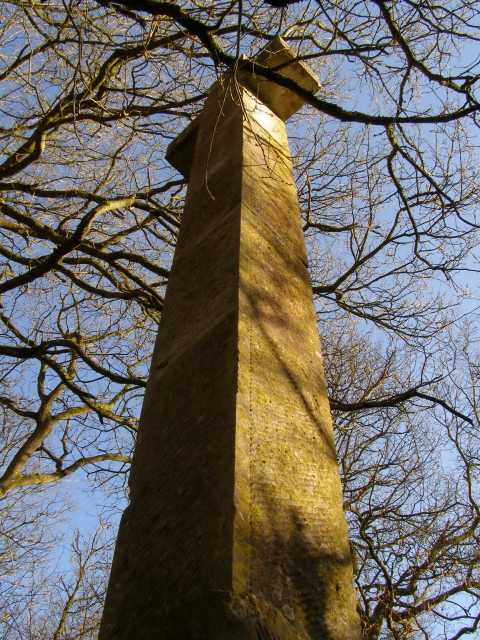
Dead Man's Plack in 2006

Edward Augustus Freeman (1823–1892) debunks the story as a "tissue of romance" in his 1875 Historic Essays and writes: "The process by which legend gets transmuted into apparent history could not have been better described than it is by Lord Macaulay." Freeman also refers to another contemporary chronicler, Geoffrey Gaimar, whose L'Estoire des Engleis ("History of the English People"; 1136–1140) describes Æthelwald's death at the hands of unidentified armed men in Wherwell Forest (Harewood Forest).

Elizabeth Norton, a historian specialising in the queens of England, concludes that "the evidence certainly does not suggest that [Æthelwald] was murdered" and that the story related by William of Malmesbury is "a later elaboration" of the reason behind Ælfthryth's foundation of nearby Wherwell Abbey, "which was popularly considered to have been carried out as an act of atonement."

== In popular culture ==
The story of Æthelwald's murder was revived by William Henry Hudson (1841–1922), a naturalist who, "fascinated like many before and after by this monument", published a romantic version of the legend in his Dead Man's Plack and an Old Thorn (1920). Hudson, who stated that he disliked Freeman "because he was so infernally cock-sure, so convinced that he and he alone had the power of distinguishing between the true and false", also went to some lengths to discredit the historian's dismissal of the story as untrue.

The story is also the subject of The King's Henchman, an opera in three acts composed by Deems Taylor to an English language libretto by Edna St. Vincent Millay. It premiered on 17 February 1927 at the Metropolitan Opera in New York City in a performance conducted by Tullio Serafin. On 18 September 1927 it became the first live opera to be broadcast on CBS Radio when it was performed in a condensed version narrated by Taylor.
