= Rumon =

Rumon may refer to:

- An ancient name for the Tiber River in Italy
- Rumon of Tavistock, a 6th-century Christian saint
- Tavistock Abbey, also known as the Abbey of Saint Mary and Saint Rumon
