= Dasent =

Dasent is a surname. Notable people with the surname include:

- Arthur Irwin Dasent (1859–1939), British civil servant, writer, and biographer
- Eduardo Dasent (born 1988), Panamanian footballer
- George Webbe Dasent (1817–1896), British lawyer, translator, and contributor
- Peter Dasent, New Zealand born composer, pianist, and songwriter
