= Arthur Irwin Dasent =

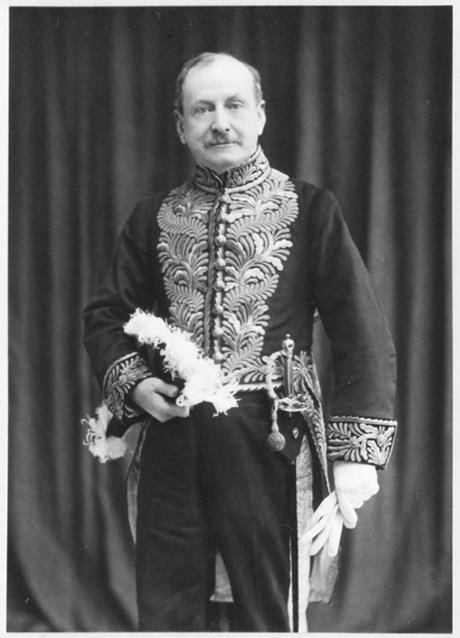
Arthur Irwin Dasent, Clerk of the Journals in the House of Commons.

Arthur Irwin Dasent (8 May 1859 – 21 November 1939) was a British civil servant, miscellaneous writer, and biographer of his uncle John Thadeus Delane.

Arthur Irwin Dasent, the youngest son of Sir George Webbe Dasent, was born in 1859 in Westminster and educated at Eton. He entered the civil service and became a clerk in the House of Commons. From 1921 to 1929 he was the first Clerk of the Parliaments of Northern Ireland. He wrote several books on the history of parts of London and numerous articles for The Saturday Review of Politics, Literature, Science, and Art, The Spectator, and similar periodicals.

In 1901, he married Helen Augusta Essex Veronica, daughter of Lieutenant Colonel Alfred Tippinge, Grenadier Guards, of Longparish House, Longparish, Hampshire; they had one son.

== Books ==
- The History of St James's Square and the Foundations of the West End of London, with a Glimpse of Whitehall in the Reign of Charles the Second. 1895.
- Popular Tales from the Norse by Sir George Webbe Dasent, with a Memoir by Arthur Irwin Dasent. 1903.
- John Thadeus Delane, Editor of "The Times". 1908.
- The Speakers of the House of Commons from the Earliest Times to the Present Day: with a topographical description of Westminster at various epochs, & a brief record of the principal constitutional changes during seven centuries. 1911.
- Piccadilly in Three Centuries, with some account of Berkeley Square and the Haymarket. 1920.
- The Story of Stafford House, now the London Museum. 1921. (See Lancaster House.)
- Nell Gwynne, 1650–1687: her life story from St. Giles's to St. James's, with some account of Whitehall and Windsor in the reign of Charles the Second. 1924.
- The Private Life of Charles the Second. 1927.
- A History of Grosvenor Square. 1935.
