= John Whitaker (historian) =

English historian and Anglican clergyman

John Whitaker FSA (1735 in Manchester – 1808 in Ruan Lanihorne), was an English historian and Anglican clergyman. Besides historical studies on the Roman Empire and on the early history of Great Britain he was a reviewer for London magazines and a poet.

== Life ==
He was the son of James Whitaker, innkeeper, and was born in Manchester on 27 April 1735. In 1771, he published the first volume of The History of Manchester; and the second volume in 1775. A copy of Whitaker's manuscript of the continuation to the fifteenth century is in Chetham's Library, Manchester.

Whitaker's views on early British society were idiosyncratic: in his History of Manchester, (1771–75) he argued that the ancient Britons had already established a feudal system, and under the Romans had been entirely converted to Christianity (his erudition was recognised as remarkable but the theories were mostly illfounded). The Life of St Neot, published posthumously in 1809, was similarly intended to challenge traditional orthodoxies in the form of the extant saint's lives. According to historian Elizabeth A. R. Brown, Whitaker was the first to coin the term "feudalism" (though not its earlier variations such as "feudal" and "feudal system") and he introduced the notion of a 'feudal pyramid'.

He took his degrees at Oxford: B.A. 1755; M.A. 1759; and B.D. 1767: he was elected a Fellow of the Society of Antiquaries of London in 1771. After taking his degrees and holding two curacies he became Rector of Ruan Lanihorne in Cornwall in 1777 or 1778. He also published a number of sermons, poems, and articles for Richard Polwhele's History of Cornwall. He was a prolific reviewer for the English Review, British Critic, and Anti-Jacobin Review, finding this an important means of supplementing his income and paying for the books necessary for his studies. In addition to his published works he had planned or contemplated a number of other projects: a parochial history of Cornwall, a military history of the Romans in Britain, a history of Oxford, one of London, notes on Shakespeare, and illustrations to the Bible. He was a man of fiery temperament and extreme views, and a fervent belief in all the tenets of ‘orthodox’ Christianity. He was able to inspire considerable friendship and loyalty from those who knew him best. His close friend Richard Polwhele described him as being of a tall, muscular frame, dark featured, and with light greenish eyes. He reputedly had a squint and wore false teeth made of ebony. He died at his rectory on 30 October 1808 and was buried in Ruan Lanihorne in Cornwall; his widow Jane (née Tregenna), who had long suffered ill health, lived on until 30 December 1828.

He studied the decline of the Cornish language and concluded in his work The Ancient Cathedral of Cornwall

The English Liturgy, was not desired by the Cornish, but forced upon them by the tyranny of England, at a time when the English language was yet unknown in Cornwall. This act of tyranny was at once gross barbarity to the Cornish people, and a death blow to the Cornish language.

== Selected works ==
- The Ancient Cathedral of Cornwall Historically Surveyed (1804) (in 2 volumes). London: John Stockdale [An account of the church of St Germans]
- The Course of Hannibal Over the Alps Ascertained (1794). London: John Stockdale
- The Genuine History of the Britons Asserted (1772). [London] : sold by Dodsley
- The History of Manchester (1771 & 1775). Books 1 & 2 (3 parts in 2 volumes). London: sold by Dodsley [et al.] [Ancient British, Roman and early Anglo-Saxon periods only]
- The Life of Saint Neot, the Oldest of all the Brothers to King Alfred (1809). London: John Joseph Stockdale (published posthumously: Stockdale was also the editor)
- Mary Queen of Scots Vindicated (1787) (in 3 volumes) London: John Murray
- The Origin of Arianism Disclosed (1791) London : Printed for John Stockdale
- The Real Origin of Government (1795). London: John Stockdale

== External links and bibliography ==
- http://www.mancuniensis.info/Chronology/Chronology1808FPX.htm

His numerous writings are listed in Bibliotheca Cornubiensis by Boase and Courtney and in Palatine Note-book, vol. i., p. 77.

- "Whitaker, John (1735-1808)" . Dictionary of National Biography. London: Smith, Elder & Co. 1885–1900.
- John Eglington Bailey (1879) John Whitaker
