= Æthelwold, Ealdorman of East Anglia =

Ealdorman of East Anglia

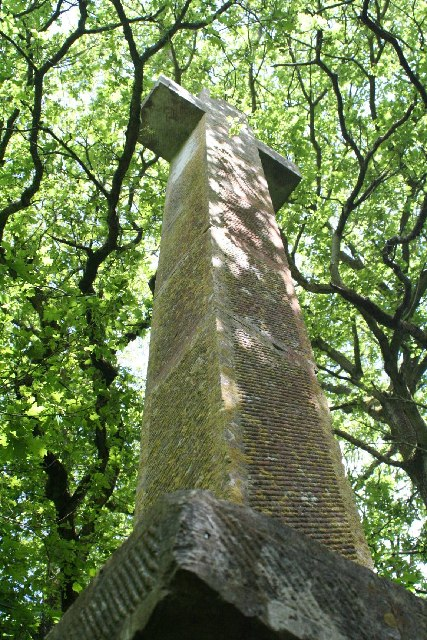
The Dead Man's Plack monument, erected in 1825, marking the supposed spot where King Edgar killed Æthelwold

Æthelwold or Æthelwald (died 962) was ealdorman of East Anglia. He is mentioned in Byrhtferth's life of Oswald of Worcester along with other members of his family.

He was probably the oldest son of Æthelstan Half-King and succeeded to some of his father's offices in 956 when Æthelstan became a monk at Glastonbury Abbey. He was a benefactor of Ramsey Abbey and a supporter of the Benedictine reform movement which began in the reign of King Edgar.

He was the first husband of Ælfthryth who married King Edgar in 964. William of Malmesbury's Gesta regum anglorum has a late account of Æthelwold's marriage and death. According to William, the beauty of Ordgar's daughter Ælfthryth was reported to King Edgar. Edgar, looking for a Queen, sent Æthelwold to see Ælfthryth, ordering him "to offer her marriage [to Edgar] if her beauty were really equal to report." When she turned out to be just as beautiful as was said, Æthelwold married her himself and reported back to Edgar that she was quite unsuitable. Edgar was eventually told of this deception, and decided to repay Æthelwold's betrayal in like manner. He said that he would visit the poor woman, which alarmed Æthelwold. He asked Ælfthryth to make herself as unattractive as possible for the king's visit, but she did the opposite. Edgar, quite besotted with her, killed Æthelwold during a hunt. These stories are dismissed by the historian Anne Williams as "romantic tales of the twlefth century". She states that Æthelwold appears to have died of natural causes.

Æthelwold was seemingly dead by 962 as he ceases to witness charters at that time. He was buried at Ramsey Abbey. His younger brother Æthelwine succeeded to his offices.

A memorial to Æthelwold, known as the Dead Man's Plack, was erected in Longparish, Hampshire in 1825.
