= HMS Abbotsham =

Minesweeper of the Royal Navy

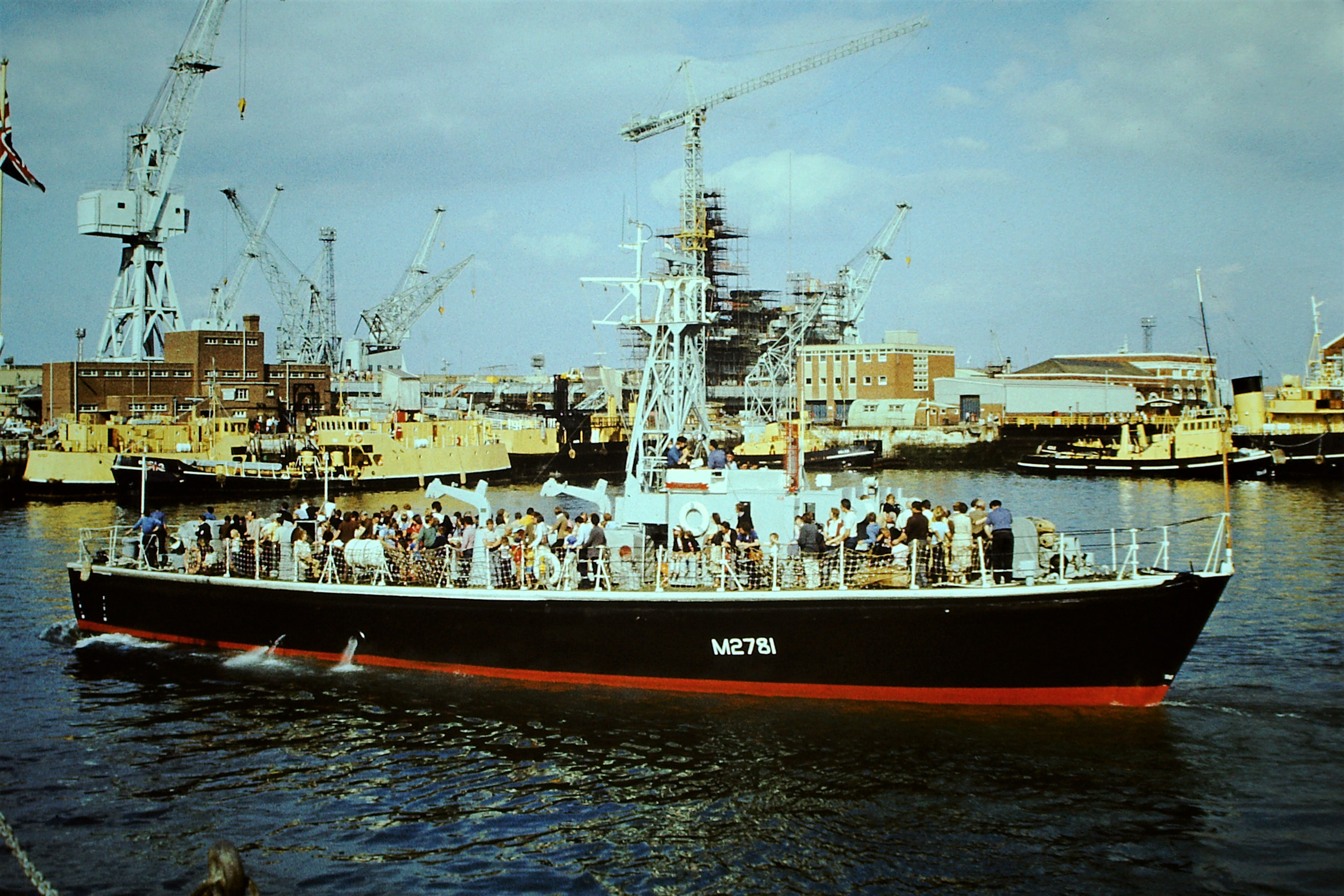
- HMS Portisham, another ship of the same class

History

United Kingdom
- Name: HMS Abbotsham
- Operator: Royal Navy
- Builder: Wm. Blackmore
- Launched: 16 December 1955
- Completed: 10 January 1957
- Out of service: 1966
- Fate: Sold June 1967.resold in 2018 in the Netherlands.
- Notes: Pennant = (M2787), (IMS87)

General characteristics
- Class & type: Ham class minesweeper
- Displacement: 120 tons standard; 159 tons full
- Length: 107 ft 6 in (32.77 m) oa; 100 ft (30.5 m) pp
- Beam: 22 ft (6.7 m)
- Draught: 5 ft 9 in (1.75 m)
- Propulsion: 2 shaft Paxman 12YHAXM diesels, 1,100 bhp (820 kW)
- Speed: 14 knots (26 km/h)
- Complement: 2 officers, 13 ratings
- Armament: 1 × 20 mm Oerlikon gun

HMS Abbotsham was one of 93 ships of the Ham class of inshore minesweepers.

Their names were all chosen from villages ending in -ham. The minesweeper was named after Abbotsham in Devon. Abbotsham was one of the third series of Ham-class minesweepers, with an all-wooden hull, and was built by William Blackmore, completing on 10 January 1957.

The Ham class proved to be too small to carry modern minesweeping gear, and like many of the class, Abbotsham was quickly placed in operational reserve, entering this state in November 1957. She remained in operational reserve at Rosneath until 1966, when she was placed on the disposal list, the ship being sold in 1967.

== See also ==
- List of ship names of the Royal Navy

== Bibliography ==
- Blackman, R.V.B. ed. Jane's Fighting Ships (1953)
- Gardiner, Robert; Chumbley, Stephen (1995). Conway's All The World's Fighting Ships 1947–1995. Annapolis, Maryland, USA: Naval Institute Press. ISBN 1-55750-132-7.
- Worth, Jack (1986). British Warships Since 1945: Part 4: Minesweepers. Liskeard, UK: Maritime Books. ISBN 0-907771-12-2.
