= John Woodcock (cricket writer) =

English cricket writer and journalist (1926–2021)

- Born: 7 August 1926; Longparish, Hampshire, England
- Died: 18 July 2021 (aged 94); Longparish, Hampshire, England
- Education: Dragon School; St Edward's School, Oxford; Trinity College, Oxford
- Writing career
- Genre: Sports
- Subject: Cricket

John Charles Woodcock OBE (7 August 1926 – 18 July 2021) was an English cricket writer and journalist. He was the cricket correspondent for The Times from 1954 until 1987.

== Early life ==
Woodcock was born in Longparish, Hampshire on 7 August 1926, the second son of the Reverend Parry Woodcock and his (much younger) wife Nora Dunsford (née Hutchinson). Since 1906 his father had been rector of Longparish, where the Woodcock family held the right of advowson. Woodcock was born in the rectory when his father was 70. His grandfather had been born in 1813, two years before the Battle of Waterloo.

His family relocated from Longparish after his father retired in 1933. Woodcock completed his primary education at the Dragon School. As a child, he was a good angler before moving onto cricket while attending St Edward's School, Oxford. When he was fifteen, he almost died from septic arthritis. His hip was permanently injured as a result, and he was strapped to a frame for four months.

Woodcock read Geography at Trinity College, Oxford. Despite his aforementioned injury, he won hockey blues in 1946 and 1947. He also reached the final trial of the university cricket team and played for the Authentics (Oxford's second XI). After graduating with fourth class honours (which he attributed to his being "very lazy"), he obtained a diploma in education, intending to become a teacher. However, E. W. Swanton managed to secure a job for him of scoring for the BBC at the Second Test at Lord's in 1948.

== Career ==
Woodcock went on the England tour of Australia in 1950–51 as a newsreel cameraman for the BBC and assistant to Swanton. He also wrote for The Manchester Guardian during the 1952 Tests against India, filling in for Denys Rowbotham. Upon Rowbotham's return, Woodcock became the paper's London sports editor. He became the cricket correspondent for The Times in 1954. He began his first stint as The Times' correspondent during the England tour of Australia in 1954–55.

Woodcock was dubbed "the Sage of Longparish" by Alan Gibson, his colleague at The Times. He served as its cricket correspondent until 1987, attending more than 400 Tests in the process. He also edited the Wisden Cricketers' Almanack for six editions from 1981 until 1986, and was credited for improving its reputation and standard. He also wrote for The Cricketer and Country Life, as well as covering some golf for The Times. He was a contributor to the Longparish Village Handbook. He did not support the sporting boycott of South Africa during the apartheid era, but later acknowledged that his position had been wrong.

Woodcock was president of the Cricket Writers' Club from 1986 to 2004, having been chairman in 1966. He was awarded an OBE in 1996 for services to sports journalism. In retirement, he was an MCC committee member.

Unlike other notable cricket journalists such as John Arlott and E. W. Swanton, little of Woodcock's writing is available in book form. He did, however, write The Times One Hundred Greatest Cricketers (Macmillan, 1998, ISBN 0-333-73641-9). He was Associate Editor of the encyclopaedia Barclay's World of Cricket, of which Swanton was the General Editor (1980 (2nd edition), Collins Publishers, ISBN 0-00-216349-7). He chose not to write an autobiography, partly through his modesty but also because he did not wish to risk harming anyone's reputation or the game itself.

At the 2018 Sports Book Awards evening, Woodcock received a special award for Outstanding Contribution to Sports Writing. Henry Blofeld said at the event, "John Woodcock is the most thorough watcher of a day’s cricket I've ever known."

Woodcock contributed his final piece for The Times in July 2020 as a tribute to the veteran West Indian cricketer Sir Everton Weekes.

After his death, Woodcock received many tributes from his fellow cricket writers. Mike Selvey wrote that he was "the finest of all cricket writers". According to Derek Pringle, "John Woodcock was the kind of scribe we’d all like to be – elegant, informative and generous with a beautiful turn of phrase." Simon Wilde said, "Some other cricket correspondents of his generation were more celebrated but he was the best.” According to Matthew Engel, "throughout his long retirement, pilgrims would descend on the thatched Hampshire cottage where Woodcock had lived more for than 70 years to imbibe his wisdom, wine, anecdotes, fellowship, good nature and what became an unparalleled memory of cricket dating back to Donald Bradman and beyond".

== Personal life ==
Woodcock was a lifelong bachelor and had no children. He returned to the village of his birth, Longparish, in 1947. In retirement there, he would have lunch at the village pub, presided over the cricket club and "was patron of the church, where a stained-glass window called 'The Four Seasons' celebrates his family's 250-year connection with the church and village".

Woodcock died on the afternoon of 18 July 2021, at the Old Curacy of Longparish. He was 94 years old.
