= Ruan Lanihorne =

Village and civil parish in south Cornwall, England

Coordinates: 50°14′N 4°58′W

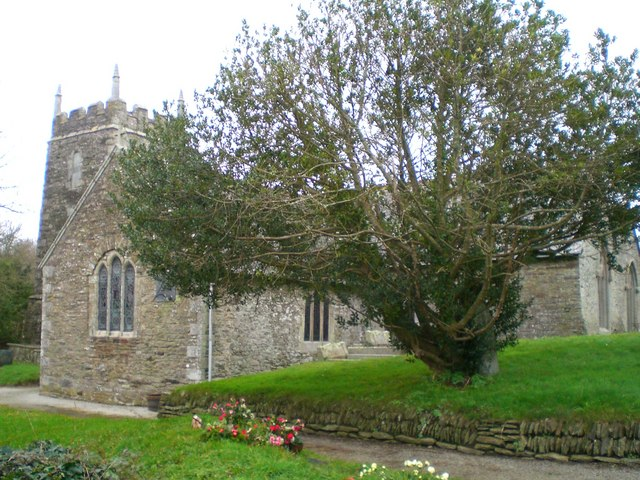
- Ruan Lanihorne parish church

- Location within Cornwall
- Population: 251 (2021 census)
- Civil parish: Ruanlanihorne
- Unitary authority: Cornwall
- Shire county: Cornwall
- Region: South West
- Country: England
- Sovereign state: United Kingdom
- Police: Devon and Cornwall
- Fire: Cornwall
- Ambulance: South Western

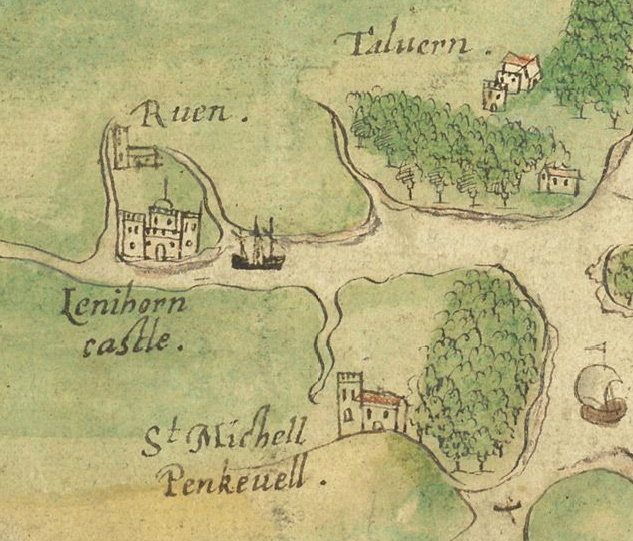
A depiction of Lanihorne Castle in 1597.

Ruan Lanihorne is a civil parish and village in south Cornwall, England, United Kingdom. The village is situated approximately four miles (6.5 km) east-southeast of Truro between the River Fal and its tributary the Ruan River.

== History and geography ==
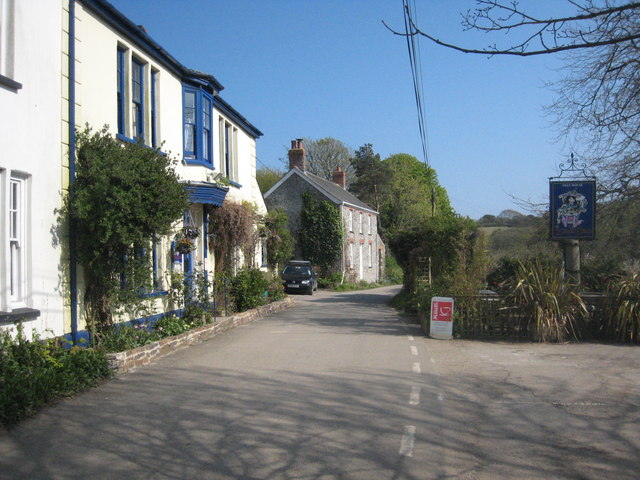
The King's Head, Ruan Lanihorne

Ruan Lanihorne lies within the Cornwall Area of Outstanding Natural Beauty (AONB).

Ruanlanihorne, as the name of the parish is spelled, is entirely rural in character with wooded areas in the river valleys. It is bounded to the north by Tregony parish, to the east by Veryan parish, to the south by Philleigh parish and to the west by St Michael Penkevil parish. Apart from the church town of Ruan Lanihorne, the only other settlements of any size are in the south of the parish: Treworga and Ruan High Lanes which is right on the parish's boundary with Veryan.

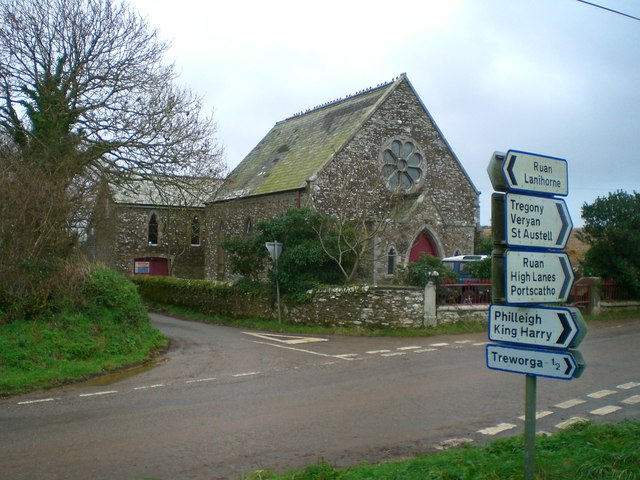
Ruan Methodist Chapel

The parish is in the Truro Registration District and the population was 250 in the 2001 census remaining similar in 2011.

The name Lanihorne is perhaps a modified form of Laryhorn (the Cornish name of this place). The village was, from the mid 12th century onwards, the site of an adulterine castle of the Arcedekne family and the main settlement was at Sheepstor (Sheepstall) some distance away towards Tregony (where the Pomeroy family also built a castle). In 1334 John Arcedekne was granted permission for the castle by Edward III. Before the castle was demolished in the 19th century, it was described as having a 40 ft high keep, seven or eight towers and possibly an outer court.

== Demographics ==
In 2017, 260 people lived in Ruan Lanihorne. According to 2011 UK census data, 93.9% of residents were born in UK and the most common religion stated was Christian (81%).

== Parish church ==
The parish church is situated in Ruan Lanihorne village at grid reference SW 894 420. The church was dedicated to St Rumonus (or Rumon) in 1321 and has a chancel and nave, a north aisle, and a south transept. The single-stage tower houses a ring of two bells.

The church is built of local grey slate stone and is Gothic in style. The font is dated about the 14th century and the tower perhaps about the same date. Restoration work included the installation of a stained glass window in 1866. The Rev John Whitaker, author of The Cathedral of Cornwall and other historical works, was Rector of Ruan Lanihorne for thirty years (1778–1808).

The Old Rectory cross is a small Gothic latin cross in the grounds of the Old Rectory. It was found buried in the churchyard before 1920 and taken to what was then the new rectory.

== Saint Rumonus ==
This saint is also honoured at Tavistock Abbey in Devon and at Ruan Major and Ruan Minor in Cornwall. For more information: see Saint Ronan and Saint Rumon in G. H. Doble's The Saints of Cornwall, part 2, pp. 120–34.
