= Rumon of Tavistock =

6th-century saint

Saint Rumon of Tavistock
- Died: 6th century
- Venerated in: Catholic Church; Anglican Communion; Orthodox Church
- Canonized: Pre-Congregation
- Major shrine: Abbey of St Mary & St Rumon (destroyed)
- Feast: 5 January (translation of relics); 1 June (Brittany); 22 July (Ireland); 28 August (England); 30 August (Orthodox)
- Patronage: Tavistock, Devon, England; Romansleigh, England
- Controversy: Identity

Rumon of Tavistock (also Ronan, Ruadan, or Ruan) is a saint venerated in the traditions of the Catholic, Anglican Communion, and Orthodox churches.

== Biography ==
Rumon was likely a missionary originally from Ireland. According to Alban Butler, Rumon was a bishop, though it is not known of what see.

Antiquary John Leland said that a manuscript discovered at Tavistock at the time of the dissolution claimed that Rumon emigrated from Ireland in the fifth or sixth century and established a hermitage near Falmouth, Cornwall.

Some authorities believe him to be the same historical figure as Ronan who is venerated in Brittany on 1 June. A "Life of St. Rumon", likely written at Tavistock sometime between the twelfth and fourteenth centuries, adapts the Life of St. Ronan. Historian Nicholas Orme considers the only accurate part is that pertaining to Ruan Lanihorne and Tavistock. A sanctum vita of Rumon in a fourteenth-century manuscript in the Ducal Library of Gotha, Germany is also based on a tenth-century Life of the Breton saint Ronan. Portions of this text relating to Rumon are quoted in the fourteenth-century Catalogus sanctorum in Anglia pausancium, a list of the resting places of English saints.

== Veneration ==
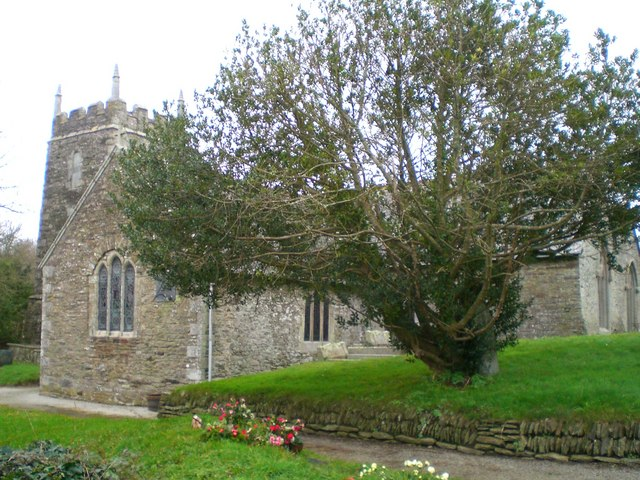
St. Rumon Church, Ruan Lanihorne

In 974, Ordulf, Earl of Devon, established the Abbey of Saint Mary and Saint Rumon at Tavistock. On 981, the relics of Rumon, minus his head, were translated from the Celtic monastery at Ruan Lanihorne to Tavistock.

Henry I of England granted the abbey the privilege of a fair for three days at the feast of St. Rumon.

In the Catholic Church, the feast of Saint Rumon is observed on various dates in different British locations. The translation of Saint Rumon is celebrated on 5 January in both the Catholic Church and Orthodox Church. The Holy Hierarch Rumon is venerated on 30 August according in Orthodoxy.

Rumon is the patron of Tavistock and Romansleigh in Devon and of Ruan Lanihorne in Cornwall. Ruan celebrates its patronal festival every year on the last Sunday in August.

Rumon is depicted as a bishop in a stained glass window in the Lady Chapel of St Eustachius' Church, Tavistock. Several churches in Devon and Cornwall are named after him as well as the village of Romansleigh.
