= The Big Sheep =

Amusement park in Abbotsham, England

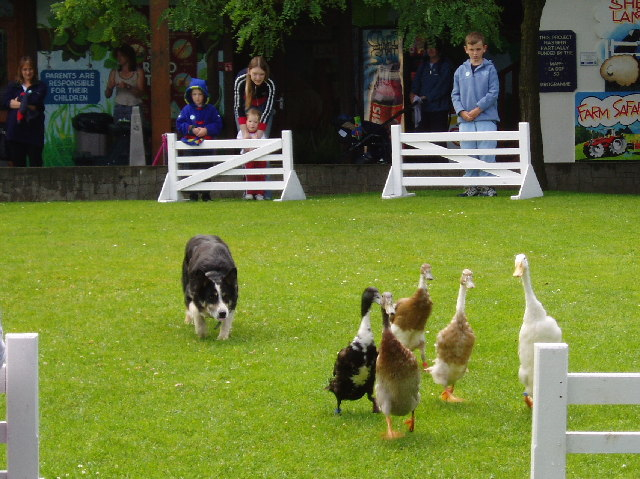
- Duck trials at the Big Sheep
- Interactive map of The Big Sheep
- Location: Abbotsham, Bideford, England, United Kingdom
- Coordinates: 51.015712°N 4.244019°W
- Opened: 1988
- Operating season: April – October (7 days); November – March (weekends)

Attractions
- Total: 7
- Roller coasters: 1
- Water rides: 0
- Website: www.thebigsheep.co.uk

The Big Sheep is an amusement farm park located in Abbotsham, Devon, England.

The site was originally part of Abbotsham Barton Farm, owned by six generations of the same family. Due to challenges in the farming community, and particularly after the new A39 North Devon Link Road divided the farm, owner Michael Turner decided to bring in more profits by turning redundant farm buildings into an attraction in 1988. The site started with an animal park, sheep milking, shop and restaurant. After its initial focus on agriculture yielded disappointing returns, the park began to add entertainment attractions as well. The park quickly gained attention for its daily sheep races and sheep shows. The park suffered substantial losses in the 2001 outbreak of foot-and-mouth disease. In 2012 the park drew attention when Michael Turner's son, Rick Turner, (who had taken over the running of the business) claimed that "needlessly pessimistic" weather forecasts by the Met Office were driving tourists away from local attractions. It also gained more exposure in March 2016 when it launched its new roller coaster but erected signs to state "no screaming" after complaints were made by local residents during the planning process.

The Big Sheep was sold to entrepreneur James Sinclair in December 2025.

== Attractions ==
The Big Sheep features an indoor playground, animal shows, brewery, gin distillery, animal barn, Battlefield Live laser tag, outdoor playground, shops and 2 restaurants. There are also currently 8 rides including a roller coaster, farm safari ride, train ride, twister ride, piggy pull along, swan pedalos, tractor school, carousel and pony rides.

During the first few months of the roller coaster's operation in 2016, it was named "The Big One". It is now named "Rampage". The roller coaster was made by Zierer and was formerly located at Metroland, the defunct indoor amusement park of the MetroCentre shopping centre in Gateshead.

Throughout the year the park also hosts many live events.
