= Alfred Tippinge =

British Army officer

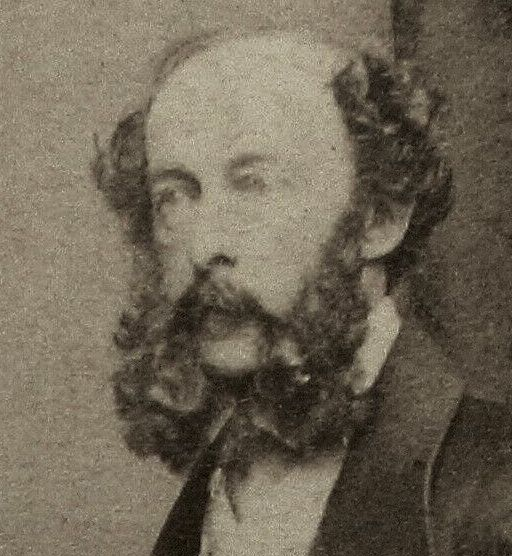
- Alfred Tippinge, circa 1861
- Born: 2 May 1817; Fulshaw Hall, Wilmslow, Cheshire
- Died: 2 August 1898 (aged 81); Andover, Hampshire, England
- Occupations: Lieutenant Colonel, Grenadier Guards
- Known for: Drawings, paintings and letters witnessing the Crimean War at first hand
- Spouse: Flora Louisa Calvert

Lieutenant-Colonel Alfred Tippinge, KCH (2 May 1817 – 2 August 1898) was a British Army officer. As a Grenadier Guard he "served with distinction" in four fields of the Crimean War of 1854: at Alma, Balaclava, Sebastapol and Inkerman. At Inkerman he was badly wounded and left for dead for 24 hours before rescue. He was awarded the Crimea Medal with four clasps, Chevalier of the Legion of Honour, the Order of the Medjidie, and the Turkish Crimea Medal. The Hampshire Advertiser later said, "He was once described as one of the bravest men in action ever known". Tippinge is known today for the drawings, paintings and letters which he sent home, illustrating at first hand the experiences of the British Grenadiers in 1854.

Tippinge married artist and musician Flora Louisa Calvert, granddaughter of Nicolson Calvert. They had three daughters, and lived at Longparish House in Longparish, Hampshire.

== Life ==
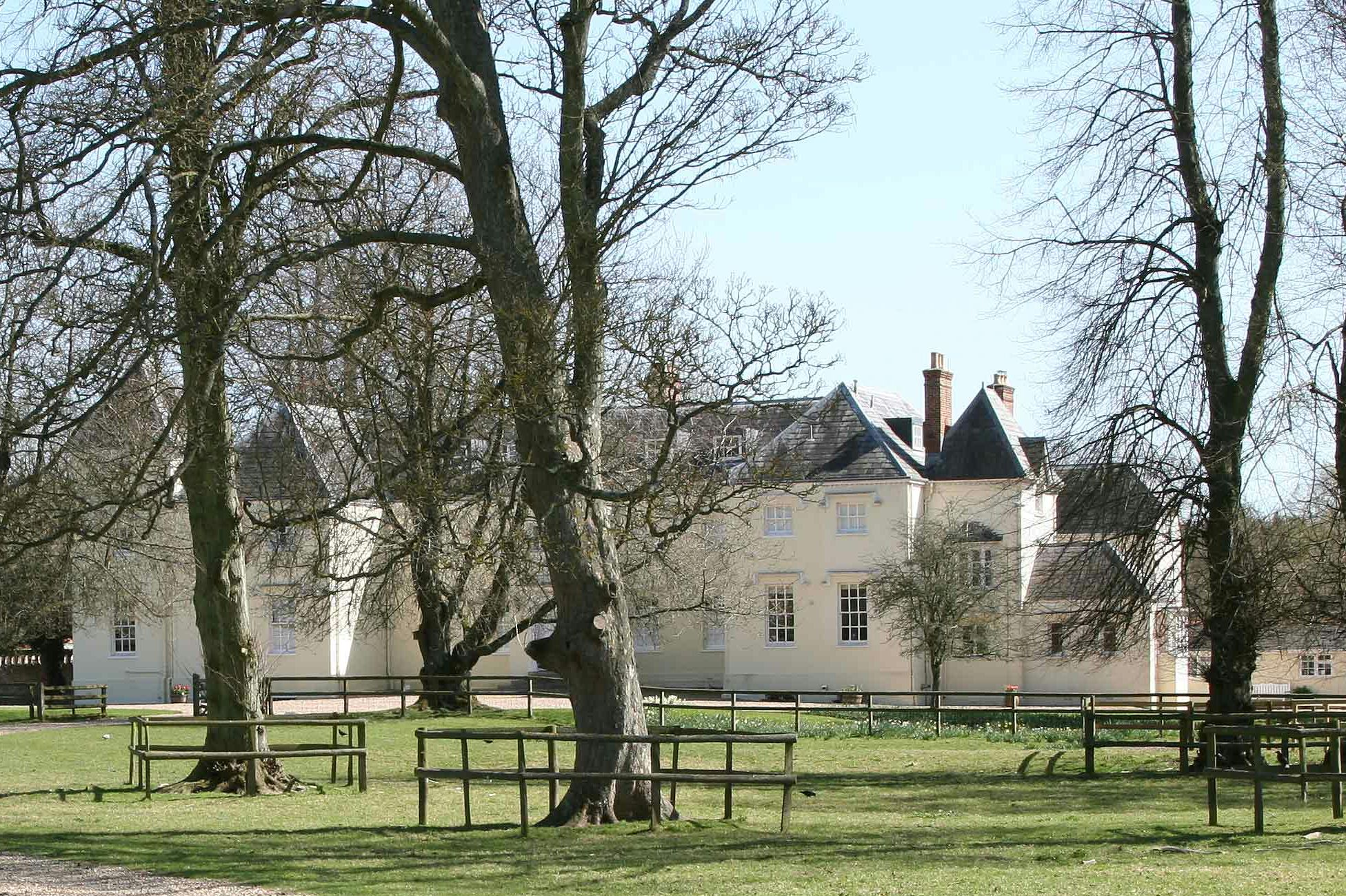
Longparish House

Lieutenant Colonel Alfred Tippinge K.C.H. of the Grenadier Guards (Wilmslow 2 May 1817 – Andover 2 August 1898), (Note: Tippinge was baptised 25 May 1817 at Wilmslow, Cheshire. See also: Deaths Sep 1898 Tippinge Alfred 81 Andover 2c 141. In the 1861 England Census he and his mother give their birthplace as Fulshaw Hall, Wilmslow, Cheshire.) rented and lived at Longparish House, Hampshire, (Note: Longparish House was previously owned by Lt Col. Peter Hawker until he died in 1853. Hawker's trustees let the house to tenants thereafter.) and Delmar Villa, Cheltenham, England. He was the fourth son of Thomas Tipping (of Crumsal Hall, Lancashire and Devonport Hall, Cheshire) and Anna Hibbert. With his brothers he attended Shrewsbury School, then he went to Sandhurst. He was a Justice of the peace for Buckinghamshire. Alfred Tippinge is buried at Longparish Cemetery, Hampshire.

=== Flora Louisa Calvert ===
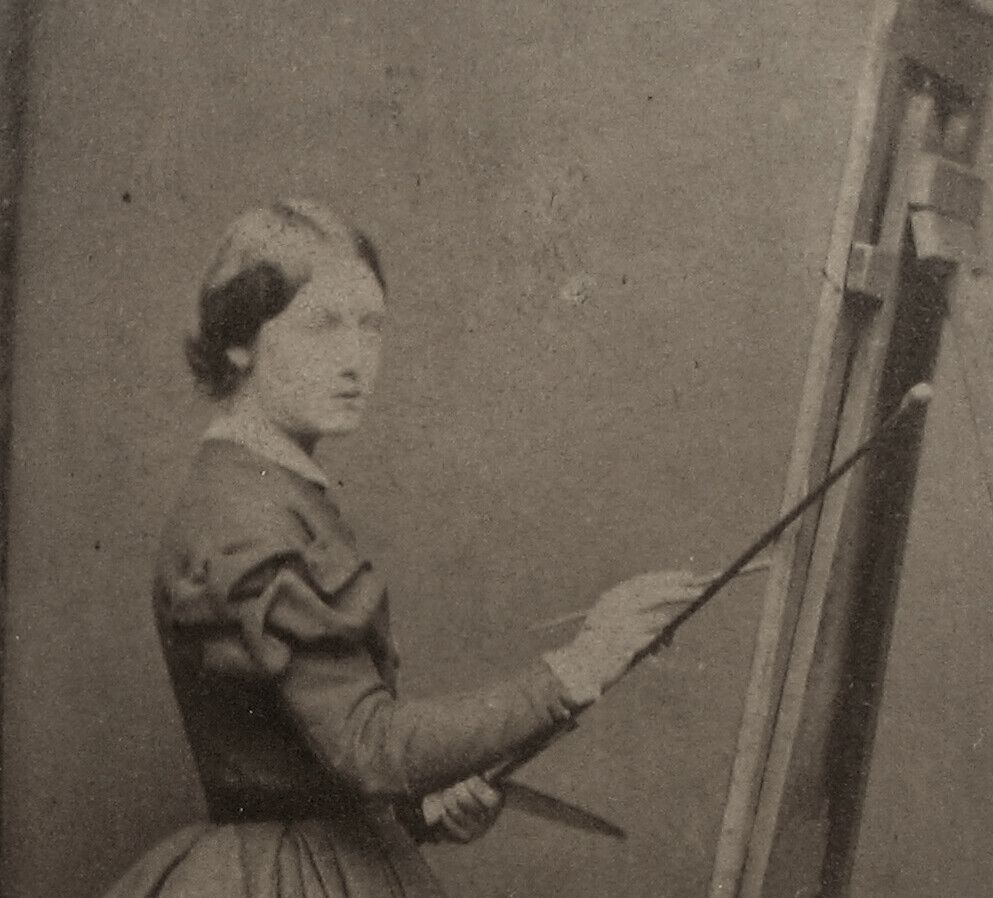
Mrs Tippinge painting

In Bridgwater on 2 October 1861 Tippinge married Flora Louisa Calvert (Marylebone 22 September 1839 or Italy 1842 – Cowes 8 May 1935). (Note: Deaths Jun 1935 Tippinge Flora L. 95 I.Wight 2b 801) She was the daughter of Nicolson Robert Calvert (4 August 1800 – 1858) and Elizabeth Blacker (1807 – 1883) of Quinton Castle, County Down, Northern Ireland. Her paternal grandfather was Nicolson Calvert (1764–1841), MP for Hertford. She did a lot for her local village. In 1893, she paid for the erection in Longparish of a red brick reading room designed by F.R. Wilkinson. (Note: F.R. Wilkinson was possibly Fanny Rollo Wilkinson, who was mainly a landscape architect. For information about her, see Myatt's Fields Park) It was demolished in the 1960s.

Flora Tippinge was an "accomplished watercolourist and linguist". She was also a musician; she sang and played instruments. She lent her skills to charity causes, and she was the organist of Tufton Church. The Hampshire and Berkshire Gasette said, "Mrs Tippinge is the talented organist, and has spared no pains nor expense in making improvements in the instrument", including the presentation of a clarionette stop. That organ had been installed in 1884, and Flora Tippinge opened it.

In 1881 Flora Tippinge took part in a concert in aid of St Mary's Church, Tufton restoration fund, singing various duets. In 1882 she performed in a concert in aid of Tufton Church organ. Mrs Tippinge opened the programme with an instrumental, and sang Love's Request with Miss Hawker, besides other instrumental pieces and songs. "A very agreeable variation was made in the programme by the substitution of a comic trio, Three Young Maids of Leeds by Mrs Tippinge and others ... The first portion was most enthusiastically encored, but the second part depicting the Three Old Maids was applauded even more than the former. A comic duet by Mrs Tippinge and Mrs Thompson ... also received an encore". In 1890 Flora wrote a comedy called Poor Tom for the Longparish villagers to perform at an entertainment, although the performance was cancelled due to non-availability of an actor.

After the death of her husband in 1898, Flora Tippinge was for many years resident at Cowes. She died there in 1935, in her 96th year.

=== Children ===
Flora and Alfred Tippinge had three daughters: Isabel Flora Augusta Hawker née Tippinge (13 April 1863 – 1938), Violet Cecil Mary Leigh née Tippinge (1865–1941), and Helena Augusta Essex Veronica (1869 – 1967), who married Arthur Irwin Dasent. Tippinge's nephew was Leicester Francis Gartside Tippinge CBE RN (Rhyl 1855 – Bournemouth 30 September 1938), (Note: Births Dec 1855 Tipping Male St Asaph 11b 333. Also see: England Census 1911: Captain Leicester F. Gartside Tippinge, age 55, born near Rhyl, Denbighshire) (Note: Deaths Sep 1938 Tippinge Leicester F. G. 83 Bournemouth 2b 888) who in 1902 had command of HMS Buzzard. Leicester was the son of Alfred Tippinge's brother the Rev. Francis Gartside Tipping. (Note: 1861 Wales Census RG9/4277 p.55, schedule 125)

== Career ==
After Sandhurst, Alfred Tippinge was an ensign of the 68th regiment in 1838. He rose through the ranks as lieutenant 1843, captain 1847, and brevet major 1854, then he transferred to the Grenadier Guards. He became captain and lieutenant colonel in 1858. He "served with distinction" in four fields of the Crimean campaign: Alma, Balaclava, Sebastapol and Inkerman. He was badly wounded at Inkerman, and "left for dead on the field ... for twenty-four hours" before rescue. Following the 1854 campaign he received "the Crimean medal with four clasps, (Note: The four Crimea Medal clasps were for Alma, Balaklava, Inkerman and Sevastopol) the Knighthood [or Chevalier] of the Legion of Honour, the fifth class of the Medjidie, and the Turkish medal". The Hampshire Advertiser called him "Inkerman hero", and said, "He was once described as one of the bravest men in action ever known". Tippinge retired from the army in 1858.

=== Letters from the Crimea campaign ===
Tippinge was an artist who depicted a number of military events of 1854, and also described them in letters home. Besides recounting historical events at first hand, Tippinge's letters reveal something of the character of the man. On the Grenadier Guards' departure from London for the Crimea campaign, he reported:

We paraded at 3.45 am ... it was pitch dark and slightly drizzling ... we did not march till past five all the way up the Strand to the station, the windows of all the upper stories were filled with females waving their handkerchiefs, men in demi-costume cheering, and during the distance of all our March there were heads innumerable of undefined genders, making demonstrations and waving adieux to us. At the station, the crowd was so immense, it was utterly impossible to make our way through it. I, like many others, was lifted completely off my legs and went into the station on the shoulders of the rabble, whom the police treated most roughly for all their pains. They bore all the kicks and cuffs, which they received with the utmost good humour. They seemed to consider themselves well repaid by having taken a last look at the British Grenadier. I could not help at the time speculating upon what the chances were against at least one half of us seeing that station again.

According to Tippinge, the going was rough between Southampton and Malta: "The wind blew hard against us, with a heavy sea ... I always find myself nearly the only one on board, who does not suffer, when it is at all rough, but with seeing so many ill all around, I was nearly being upset myself."

The Guards reached Scutari, but it was an army unused to handling pack animals. According to Tippinge:

You have no idea there of the difficulty of putting on your beast's back all that you require, and to pack it in such a manner as to be able to go up and down hills, cross rivers, or go through trees or other obstacles. It is quite marvellous how one has to curtail what have hitherto been considered essential to one's existence. We are obliged to carry three days' provision with us, this amounts to 100 lbs. The tent we have to carry weighs 60 lbs, but I have bought a little portable one and waterproof, which weighs 6 pounds, but when you consider that these articles when your bedding, independently of your canteen for cooking your dinner, are almost enough for a mule, before your personal luggage begins, you may fancy how few things we can take. Our dinners are precisely the same as those of the soldiers, consisting of one pound of bread, and one pound of meat, cooked over sticks in the open air; of course there is not such a thing as a cooking stove in the Brigade, as it could not be carried.

The Brigade arrived at Varna, Bulgaria on 13 June 1854, finding the camping conditions wet and unhealthy. Tippinge reported that the Commissariat had hired 140 bullock wagons on the army's behalf, to carry ammunition and any sick and wounded men. However the Commissariat had not paid the drivers their rations, pay, and animal feed as promised, so the drivers had left. The army then discovered that they also had no food or pay, because "the whole business seems to have no director". In those conditions, in up to 97 degrees Fahrenheit, the soldiers had to make "3000 Gabions in 10 days" for fortifications, as well as performing training operations in "burning heat".

There was a "terrible fire at Varna which destroyed half the town, and a great deal of the stores" of the French and British armies. Tippinge described it:

There were scenes of the extraordinary kind going forward, during the fire ... The soldiers broke into the spirit stores, and some of them died at the casks, vowing eternal fidelity and that nothing but death should part them. One fellow was burned to death from the barrel igniting, while he was tapping it. The powder magazine was surrounded with flames and our 50th regiment climbed to the top of the roof of the building then spread blankets, over which they poured water, and thus saved our powder stores from destruction.

The British army camped at Galata near Varna, and the men had become dispirited. Tippinge said:

The tents are all dripping wet, everything inside ditto, and your clothes sticking to the skin, as if glued on. Such a tremendous hurry skurry. Mules are all to be packed to the sound of bugles. The tents thrown down at the same moment, at a signal from the instrument, whatever the state of its interior may be, the men let go the ropes, and in a second, everything is suddenly transformed, from, as it were the midst of the town, to that of the field, where you are sometimes caught with one stocking on and one stocking off, or trying to get your arm through a damp sleeve in your shirt, as the first had penetrated, and then sticking half way. However here we stay, I believe till we embark ...

The atmosphere changed when the men could look forward to action, as they embarked for the Crimea. Tippinge described the mood thus:

[We] hope to sail tomorrow ... and then make our descent upon the Crimea. It'll be a splendid thing to see, and to have seen, and a capital thing to have had a part in, if Providence brings one out of it. If it depends upon British pluck, and military zeal, I'm sure we'd all succeed and then I hope we may see some prospect of a termination of the war. The expedition is certainly on a magnificent scale; as far as the eye can see masses of vessels of all sorts and sizes. Such a fleet is a most formidable armament, when you add to those on the plan the fleet of vessels of war, which are three-deckers and several others, carrying 90 and 91 guns each. Then the French line of steamers and transports, numbering about the same as our own, in addition to several Turkish men of war, and their force of about 10,000. We are about 50 miles from the Crimea now, so I expect we shall soon see our enemy.

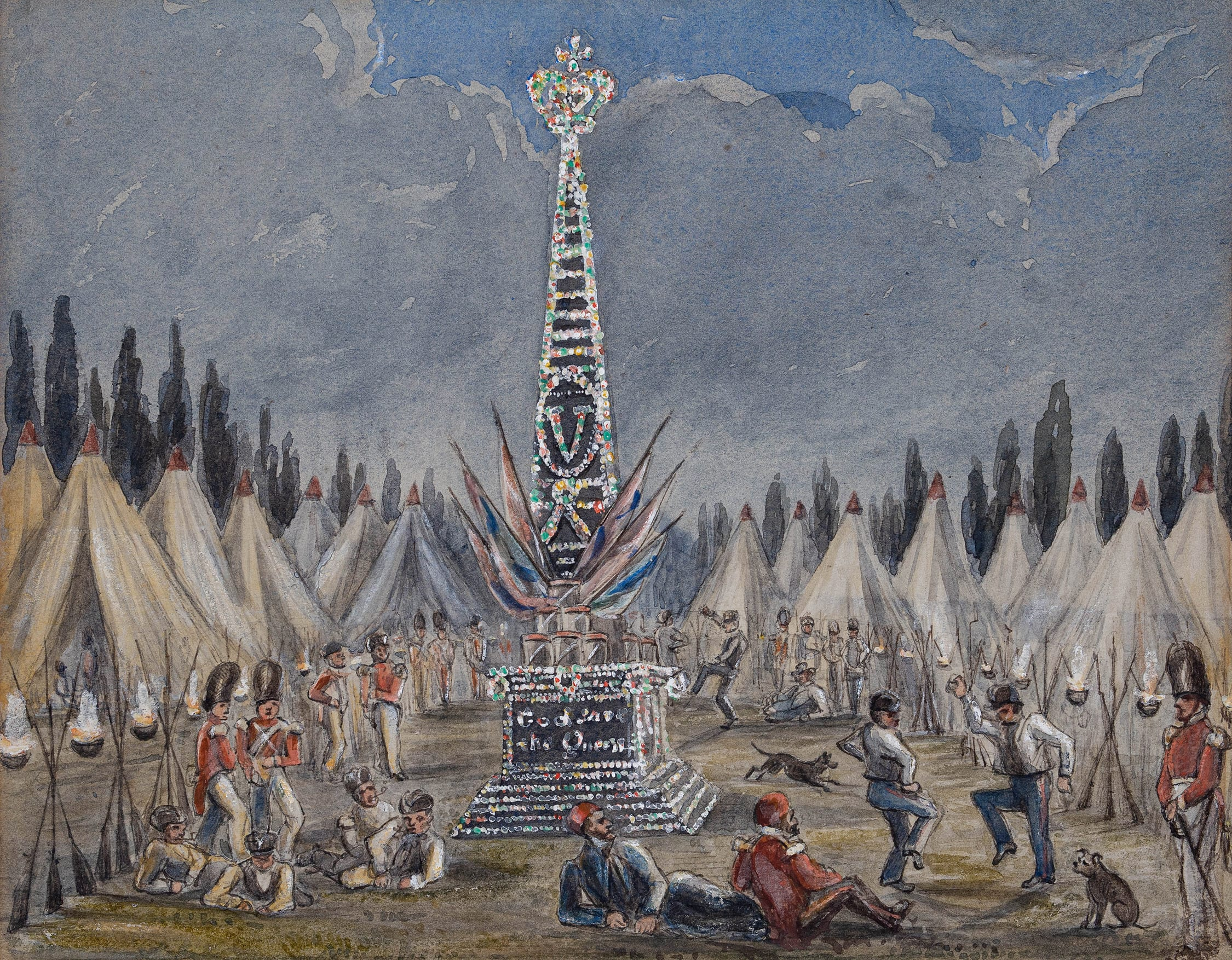
Crimean War. Celebration of the Queen's Birthday, Guards Camp, 1854, by Tippinge

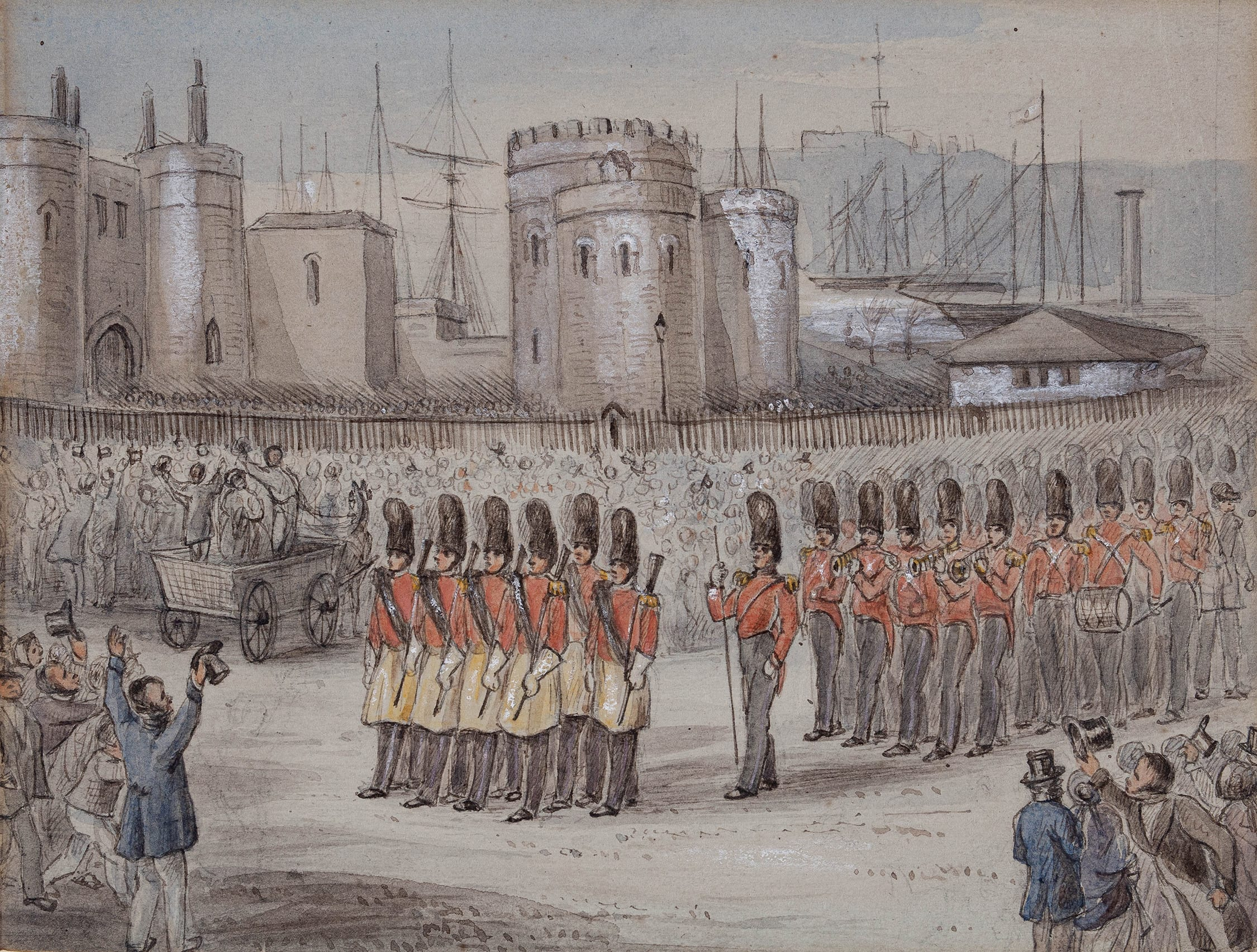
Grenadier Guards leaving the Tower prior to embarking on foreign service, 1854, by Tippinge

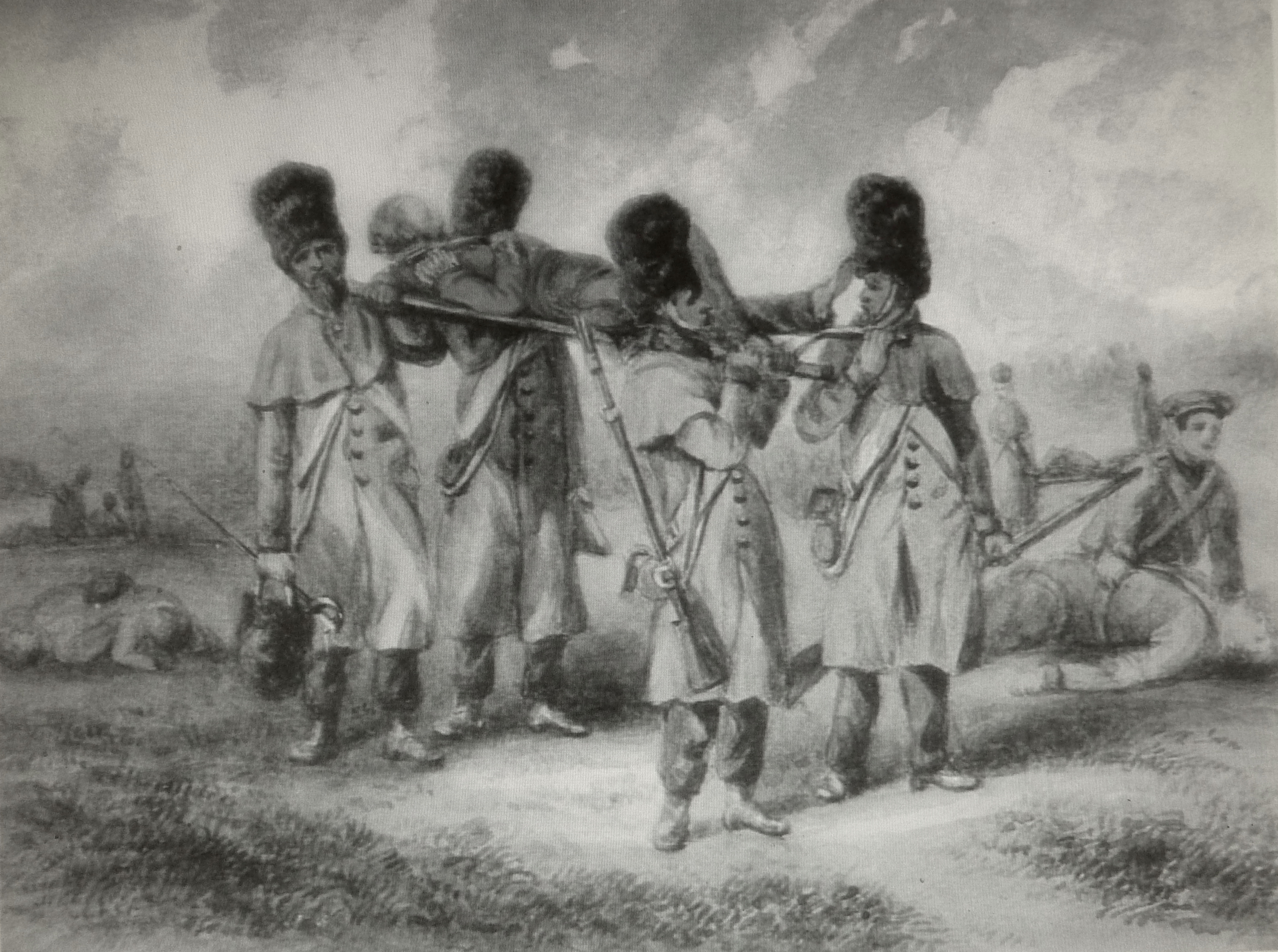
Captain Alfred Tippinge being carried wounded from the Inkerman battlefield, 1854, by Tippinge

== Bibliography ==
- Tippinge, Captain Alfred (1854). Letters from the East during the Campaign of 1854. "manuscript in 2 volumes"
