= Ealdorman of Devon =

Noble title in Saxon England

The Ealdorman of Devon in England before the Norman Conquest of 1066, was the Ealdorman, that is the king's deputy as local ruler, of the shire of Devon. Following the Norman Conquest the office was re-invented, if not actually continued, as Earl of Devon.

== Known ealdormen of Devon ==
- Ceorl (fl. 851), under King Æthelwulf. He won a battle against the Vikings at Wicganbeorg.
- Odda (fl. 878), under Alfred the Great, led Anglo-Saxon forces in the Battle of Cynwit, ultimately defeating an army led by Viking chieftain Ubba.
- Æthelred (d. 899), under Alfred the Great. He died four weeks before the king according to the Anglo-Saxon Chronicle.
- Ordgar (d. 971), under King Edgar (ruled 959–975). He founded Tavistock Abbey in 961. His son was Ordwulf (died after 1005), who realised the founding.
