= Ordwulf =

Anglo-Saxon nobleman

Ordwulf or Ordulf (died after 1005) was the son of Ordgar, Ealdorman of Devon (died 971). His sister was Queen Ælfthryth, third wife of King Edgar (born 943, died 975; ruled 959-975) The Peaceful and mother of King Æthelred II (c. 968-1016) The Unready, during whose reign Ordwulf was a major figure.

Ordwulf did not succeed his father as ealdorman but was however described by the chronicler John of Worcester as Dumnoniae Primus, that is "First in Devon". This suggests he may have held the office of "High Reeve of Devon", and was possibly reeve of the royal manor of Lifton in Devon, which also included lands in East Cornwall.

He attested diplomas from 980 and in 993 was referred to as one of the king's chief counsellors. He frequently attested with Brihtwold, another royal kinsman. Together with Æthelmar and Wulfgeat the king's "beloved thane" he encouraged the king to restore the lands and liberties of Abingdon Abbey in Oxfordshire. According to Goscelin, together with his nephew King Æthelred he saw a vision of the king's recently deceased illegitimate half-sister Edith of Wilton (961-984)(Saint Edith) which led to the translation of her relics thirteen years after her death. He received a bequest of two valuable books, Hrabanus and a martyrology, in the will of Ælfwold III (Bishop of Crediton) (died 1011/1015).

Ordwulf married Ælfwynn, who donated some of her Devonshire manors to her husband's foundation Tavistock Abbey including: Hame (Abbotsham), Werdgete (Worthygate, in Parkham parish), Orlege (Orleigh) and Anri (Annery).

Older historians thought that Tavistock Abbey was founded in 961 by Ordgar but the modern consensus is that it was wholly the foundation of Ordwulf in 974; in 981 the charter of confirmation was granted by King Æthelred the Unready, Ordwulf's nephew.

Ordwulf disappears as a witness in surviving charters after 1005, but is recorded as still living at that date. He retired as a monk to his foundation of Tavistock Abbey.
