= Ordgar =

Ealdorman of Devon

Ordgar (died 971) was Ealdorman of Devon in England. He was a great West Country landowner and apparently a close advisor of his son-in-law Edgar the Peaceful, king of England. His daughter Ælfthryth was King Edgar's third wife and was the mother of King Æthelred the Unready (c.968 – 1016). He was created an ealdorman by King Edgar in 964.

== Biography ==
=== Historical sources ===
Little is known about Ordgar other than what survives in three historical sources:

- His name appears as a witness on charters of King Edgar between 962 and 970.
- Digressions in William of Malmesbury's Gesta pontificum Anglorum
- More substantial references in Geoffrey Gaimar's L'Estoire des Engles regarding the love affairs and marriages of his daughter Ælfthryth

== Gaimar's account ==
According to Gaimar, Ordgar was the son of an ealdorman, and owned land in every parish from Exeter in Devon to Frome in Somerset. He married an unknown lady of royal birth, by whom he had a daughter Ælfthryth. The Oxford Dictionary of National Biography draws a conclusion that Ordgar was "clearly a figure of some importance" to have secured such a match. King Edgar determined on marrying Ælfthryth and to this end he sent Æthelwald, Ealdorman of East Anglia as his agent to woo her. On arrival Æthelwald found her in company with her father Ordgar, whom she completely controlled by her personality, playing chess, which they had learned from the Danes. Æthelwald instead took Ælfthryth for his own wife and married her in about 956.

Æthelwald died in 962, and Dunstan suspected that he was murdered by his wife Ælfthryth who thereafter, according to Dunstan, seduced King Edgar and murdered his son Prince Edward the Martyr in order to pave the way for the crowning of her son Æthelred as king. It is, however, certain that, under whatever actual circumstances, Ælfthryth became King Edgar's third wife in 964 and in the same year her father Ordgar was created ealdorman. The ODNB supposes that Ordgar from the time of his daughter's royal marriage until 970 was one of Edgar's closest advisors, by virtue of his being named as a witness on almost all charters issued by King Edgar during the period.

== Tavistock Abbey ==
Older historians thought that Tavistock Abbey was founded in 961 by Ordgar but the modern consensus is that it was wholly the foundation of his son Ordwulf in 974; the charter of confirmation was granted in 981 by King Æthelred, Ordwulf's nephew.

== Death and burial ==
Ordgar died in 971. According to William of Malmesbury, he was buried with his son Edulf at Tavistock, Devon, but according to Florence of Worcester, he was buried at Exeter.

== Issue ==
The name of Ordgar's wife is not known; however, he is known to have issue:

- Ordwulf (died after 1005), High Reeve of Devon
- Ælfthryth, Queen Consort of England, married King Edgar of England.
- Edulf (died 971 or before), was of gigantic strength and stature.
