= Longparish =

Village and parish in Hampshire, England

Coordinates: 51.2010°N 1.3788°W

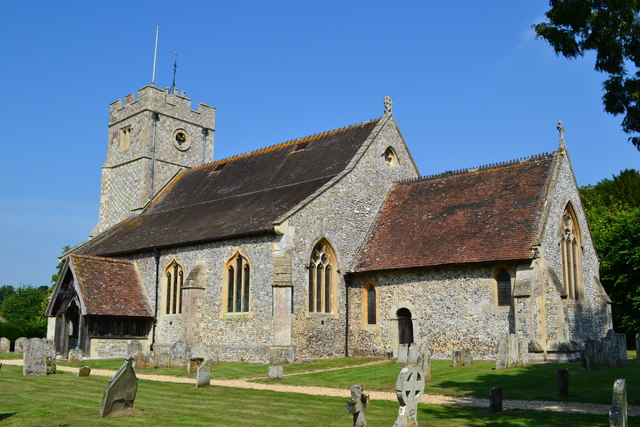
- St Nicholas Church, Longparish

- Location within Hampshire
- Population: 716
- OS grid reference: SU434448
- District: Test Valley
- Shire county: Hampshire
- Region: South East
- Country: England
- Sovereign state: United Kingdom
- Post town: Andover
- Postcode district: SP11
- Dialling code: 01264
- Police: Hampshire and Isle of Wight
- Fire: Hampshire and Isle of Wight
- Ambulance: South Central
- UK Parliament: Romsey and Southampton North

Longparish is a village and civil parish in Hampshire, England. It is composed of the five hamlets of Middleton, East Aston, West Aston, Forton and Longparish Station that over time have expanded and effectively joined up to become one village. Longparish is situated on the northwest bank of the River Test. In 2011 the population (including Firgo and Forton) was 716.

== Etymology ==
The name Longparish was first used in the mid-16th-century and is derived from a nickname for the "long parish" of Middleton — consisting of the settlements of Middleton, East Aston, West Aston and Forton — which stretched some four miles along the River Test. The parish of Middleton was first recorded as "Middletune" in the Domesday Survey of 1086. The foundation of a small settlement to support the newly created Longparish Station in 1885 has led to the village boundary extending south of the A303.

== Landmarks ==
A 19th-century monument, Dead Man's Plack, stands nearby.

== Notable people ==
- Colonel Peter Hawker, 19th-century diarist, author and sportsman who lived at Longparish House.
- Major Lanoe Hawker VC, Royal Flying Corps ace was born here; A window (designed by Francis Skeat) commemorating Hawker was installed in St Nicholas church in 1967.
- Lt Col. Alfred Tippinge of the British Grenadiers, recipient of the Legion of Honour, lived at Longparish House.
- John Charles Woodcock OBE, cricket writer, born and lived here all his life
