= Tavistock Abbey =

Ruined Benedictine abbey in Devon, England

Coordinates: 50.5494°N 4.1450°W

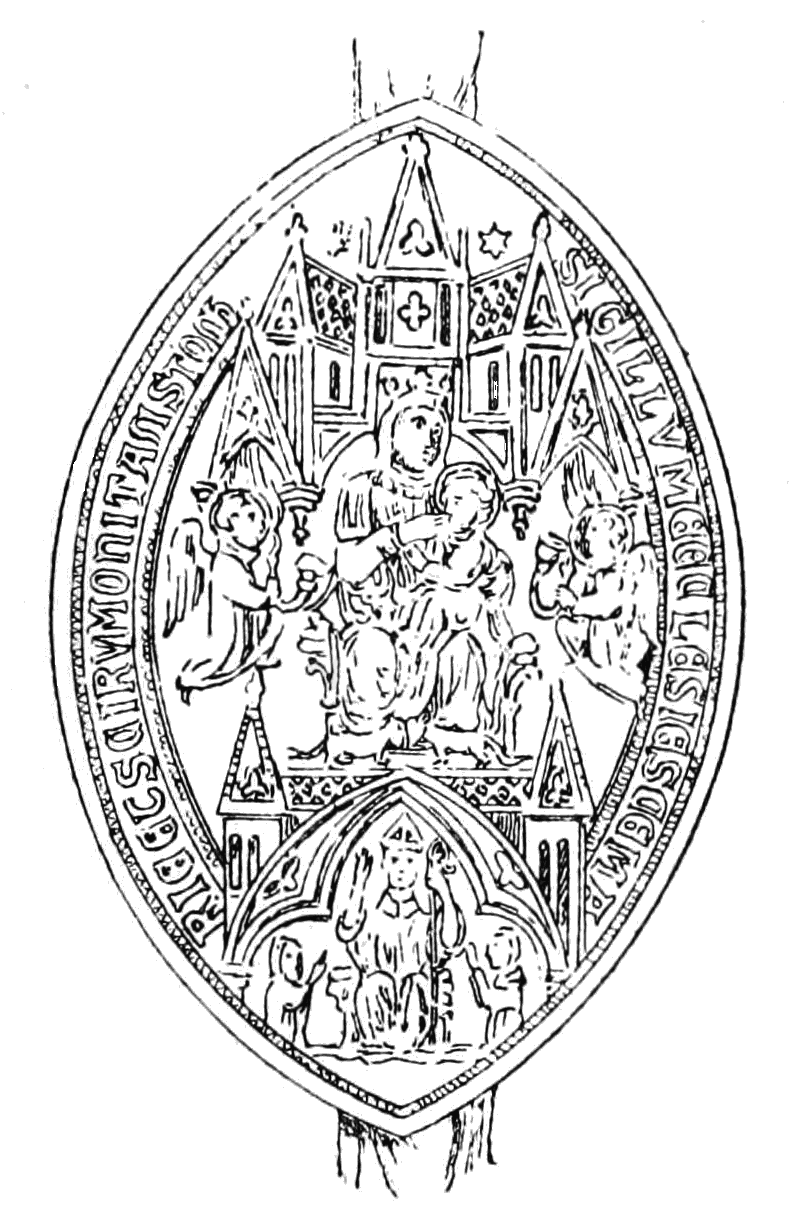
Seal of Tavistock Abbey affixed to a lease of 1542, showing St Mary with the infant Jesus seated on her lap, with a mitred abbot seated below, all surrounded by the legend: SIGILLUM ECCLESI(A)E S(AN)C(TA)E MARI(A)E ET S(AN)C(T)I RUMONI TAVISTOCK ("seal of the Church of Saint Mary and of Saint Rumon of Tavistock")

Tavistock Abbey, also known as the Abbey of Saint Mary and Saint Rumon, is a ruined Benedictine abbey in Tavistock, Devon. The Abbey was surrendered in 1539 during the Dissolution of the Monasteries. Nothing remains of the abbey except the refectory, two gateways and a porch. The abbey church, dedicated to Our Lady and St Rumon, was destroyed by Danish raiders in 997 and rebuilt under Lyfing, the second abbot. The church was further rebuilt in 1285 and the greater part of the abbey between 1457 and 1458.

== History ==
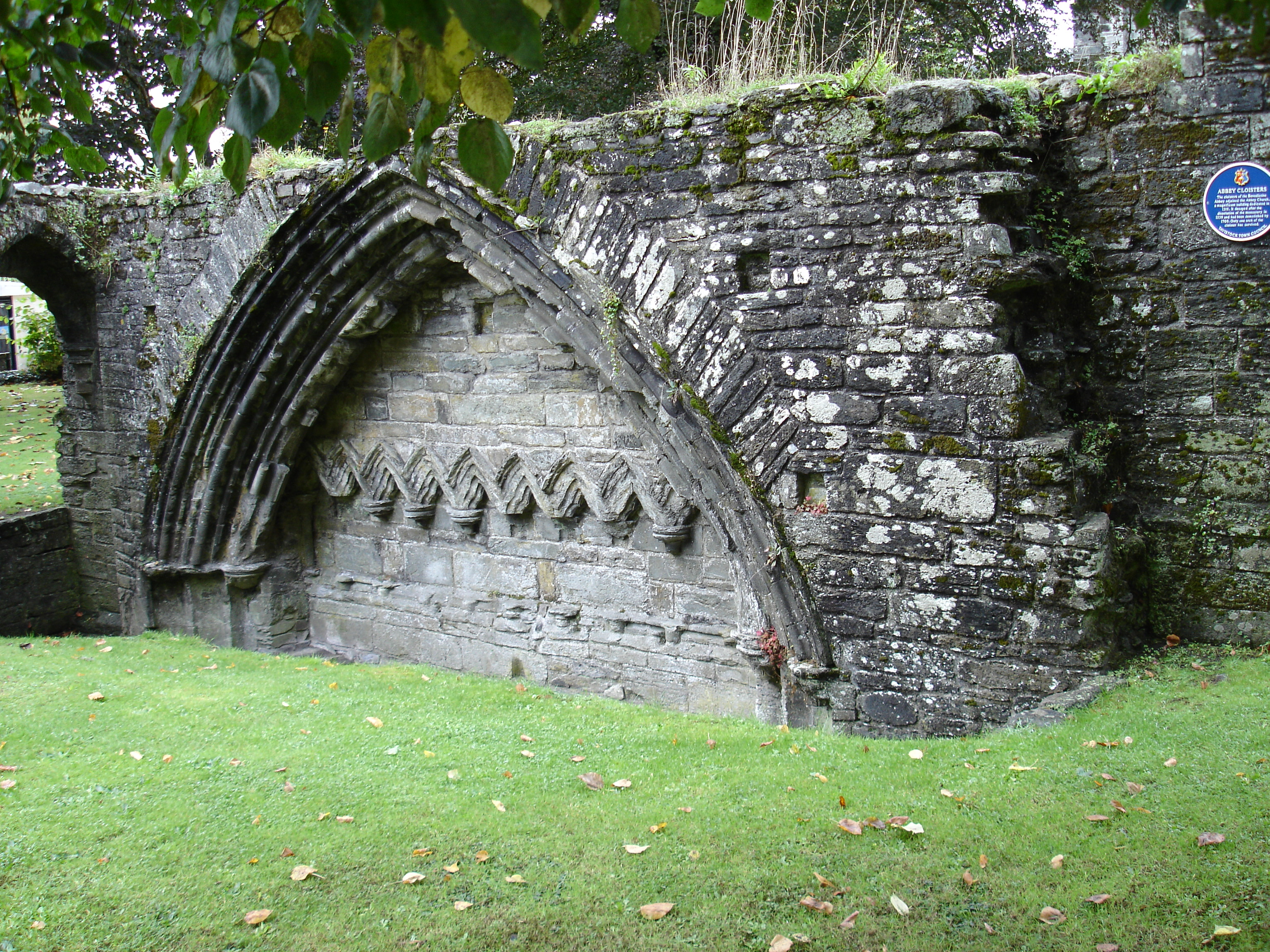
Remains of the cloister arches

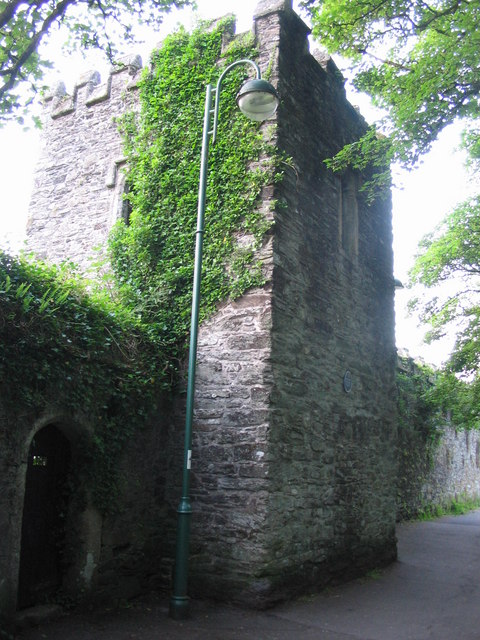
The abbey still house

=== Foundation ===
Older historians thought the abbey was founded in 961 by Ordgar, Ealdorman of Devon, but the modern consensus is that it was wholly the foundation of his son Ordwulf in 974; in 981 the charter of confirmation was granted by King Æthelred the Unready, Ordwulf's nephew. It was endowed with lands in Devon, Dorset and Cornwall, and became one of the richest abbeys in the west of England.

==== Account by Dugdale ====
William Dugdale's Monasticon Anglicanum (1718 edition in English) states as follows concerning the foundation:

In the reign of King Edgar an Earl call'd Ordulphus had a vision commanding him to build an oratory in a certain place mark'd out to him, which he did, making it large enough to contain 1,000 persons, and erecting habitations for several monks, whom he also plac'd there under an abbat. The lands he and his kindred and friends gave to this monastery were: Tavistock, Midleton, Hatherlege (Hatherleigh), Berliton, Leghe, Dunethem, Chuvelin, Lankinghorn, Home, Werelgete, Orlege (Orleigh), Auri (Annery), Rame, Savyock, Pannastan, Tomebiry, Colbrok, Lege, Wulsitheton, and Clymesland. These never to be alienated and to be free from all impositions, except an expedition undertaken and the repairing of forts and bridges. This was confirmed in the year 981 and in the reign of King Ethelred...The Bull of Pope Celestin dated 1193 confirms all donations made to these monks...

=== 1193 papal bull ===
A "Bull of Exemption and Confirmation" dated 1193 granted by Pope Celestine III (reigned 1191–1198) records the landholdings of the abbey thus:

- Middelton (Milton Abbot, in Lifton, later Tavistock, hundred)
- Hatherlega (Hatherleigh)
- Boryngton (Burrington, a manor in North Tawton hundred)
- Lega (Romansleigh)
- Abbedesham (Abbotsham)
- Weredeget (Worthygate, Parkham)
- Ordlegh (Orleigh)
- Auri (Annery)
- Tornebury (Thornbury, a manor in Black Torrington hundred)
- Rauburga/Roughburgh (Roborough, near Tavistock)
- One house in the City of Exeter
- Wella (Coffinswell, a manor in Haytor hundred)
- Daggecumba (Daccombe, within Coffinswell)
- Plymstok (Plymstock)
- Raddon (Raddon, Thorverton)
- Hundetorre (Hound Tor, Manaton)
- Odatrew (Ottery, in Lamerton)

=== Later abbots ===
Abbot Lyfing and his successor Abbot Ealdred both became Bishops of Worcester, and the latter is said to have crowned King William the Conqueror. The thirty-sixth abbot, John Dynynton, was granted leave in 1458 to use various pontificalia and the mitre, which latter gave him a seat in Parliament. The thirty-ninth abbot, Richard Banham or Baynham, was made a lord of Parliament by King Henry VIII in 1513.

=== Dissolution ===
On 3 March 1539 the last abbot, John Peryn, together with twenty monks, surrendered the abbey to the king and was granted a pension of a hundred pounds. The abbey was the second wealthiest in Devon at the time of the Dissolution of the Monasteries (1536–1541), estimated at £902, only very slightly behind the wealth of Plympton Abbey. Both were far wealthier than the next wealthiest, Buckfast Abbey, with an annual income of about £460. In 1540 the abbey and its lands were granted by King Henry VIII to John Russell, 1st Baron Russell of Chenies in Buckinghamshire (created in 1550 1st Earl of Bedford). The Russell family long maintained a close connection with Tavistock, and in 1694 the family received the additional titles of Marquess of Tavistock and Duke of Bedford. They erected many 19th-century public buildings and statues in the town at their own expense. Before 1810 the family had only one formal residence in Devonshire, namely the townhouse of Bedford House in the City of Exeter. In 1810 John Russell, 6th Duke of Bedford built to the designs of Sir Jeffry Wyattville a new residence named Endsleigh Cottage at Milton Abbot, near Tavistock, a former manor belonging to the abbey. It was a large cottage orné used as a summer holiday home, still standing but sold in the 20th century by the Russell family. It is now the Hotel Endsleigh, managed by Alex Polizzi and owned by her mother.

=== Saint Rumon ===
St Rumon was probably a brother of St Tudwal of Tréguier, but little else is known of him beyond that he was probably an Irish missionary and many churches in Devon and Cornwall in England were named after him. Some authorities have identified him with St Ronan (1 June) who is venerated in Brittany. At Tavistock, his feast day is kept on 28 or 30 August. The translation of St Rumon is celebrated on 5 January.

=== Cornwall ===
The abbey had considerable land holdings in Cornwall and three churches there are dedicated to St Rumon: Ruan Lanihorne, Ruan Major and Ruan Minor. In the Domesday Book, the abbey held the manors of Sheviock, Antony, Rame, Tregrenna, Penharget and Tolcarne, while four other manors formerly theirs had been taken by Robert of Mortain. Only Sheviock was in the hands of the abbey while Ermenhald held five manors from it. Sheviock was worth 60s per annum and the holdings of Ermenhald were worth in all £8-15s. These were the same values as formerly suggesting the monks were good at administering their estate. These lands in the extreme south-east of Cornwall were the reason for that district being part of Devon from the medieval period until 1844.

In early times the Isles of Scilly were in the possession of a confederacy of hermits. King Henry I gave the hermits' territory to the abbey of Tavistock, which established a priory on Tresco that was abolished at the Reformation.

== Burials ==
- Lyfing of Winchester
- Ordgar, Ealdorman of Devon
- Eadwig Ætheling
- Ordwulf

== Hurdwick quarry ==
The monks owned nearby Hurdwick quarry, the stone from which is notable for its greenish colour. Tavistock is built, in large parts, of this material. On close inspection, the stone appears to have a pitted surface that can be confused with decay.

== Modern day ==
The Abbey and grounds are open daily from 10 a.m, and is wheelchair accessible. The Abbey is managed by Tavistock Heritage Trust. A recent grant of £6,932 from government body Historic England has allowed restoration works to begin.

It is free to enter the Abbey.

== See also ==
- Abbot of Tavistock
- Dartmoor crosses
- Morwellham Quay – was established by the monks
- List of monastic houses in Devon
- List of monastic houses in England

== Bibliography ==
- Herbermann, Charles, ed. (1913). "Tavistock Abbey" . Catholic Encyclopedia. New York: Robert Appleton Company.
