= Cyneberht =

Cyneberht is an Anglo-Saxon name

- Cyneberht early 8th century Bishop of Lindsey
- Cyneberht of Winchester 8th century Bishop of Winchester
