= Wulfred (disambiguation) =

Wulfred can refer to:

- Wulfred, the Archbishop of Canterbury
- Wulfred of Lichfield, the Bishop of Lichfield
