= Ceolwulf =

Ceolwulf, occasionally spelt Ceolwulph, may refer to:

- Ceolwulf I of Mercia, King of Mercia (821–823)
- Ceolwulf II of Mercia (died c. 879), King of Mercia
- Ceolwulf of Northumbria (died 765), King of Northumbria, monk and saint
- Ceolwulf of Wessex (died. c. 611), King of Wessex
- Ceolwulf of Lindsey (died 796), Bishop of Lindsey
