= Louth Museum =

Museum in Louth, Lincolnshire, England

Coordinates: 53°22′05″N 0°00′19″W

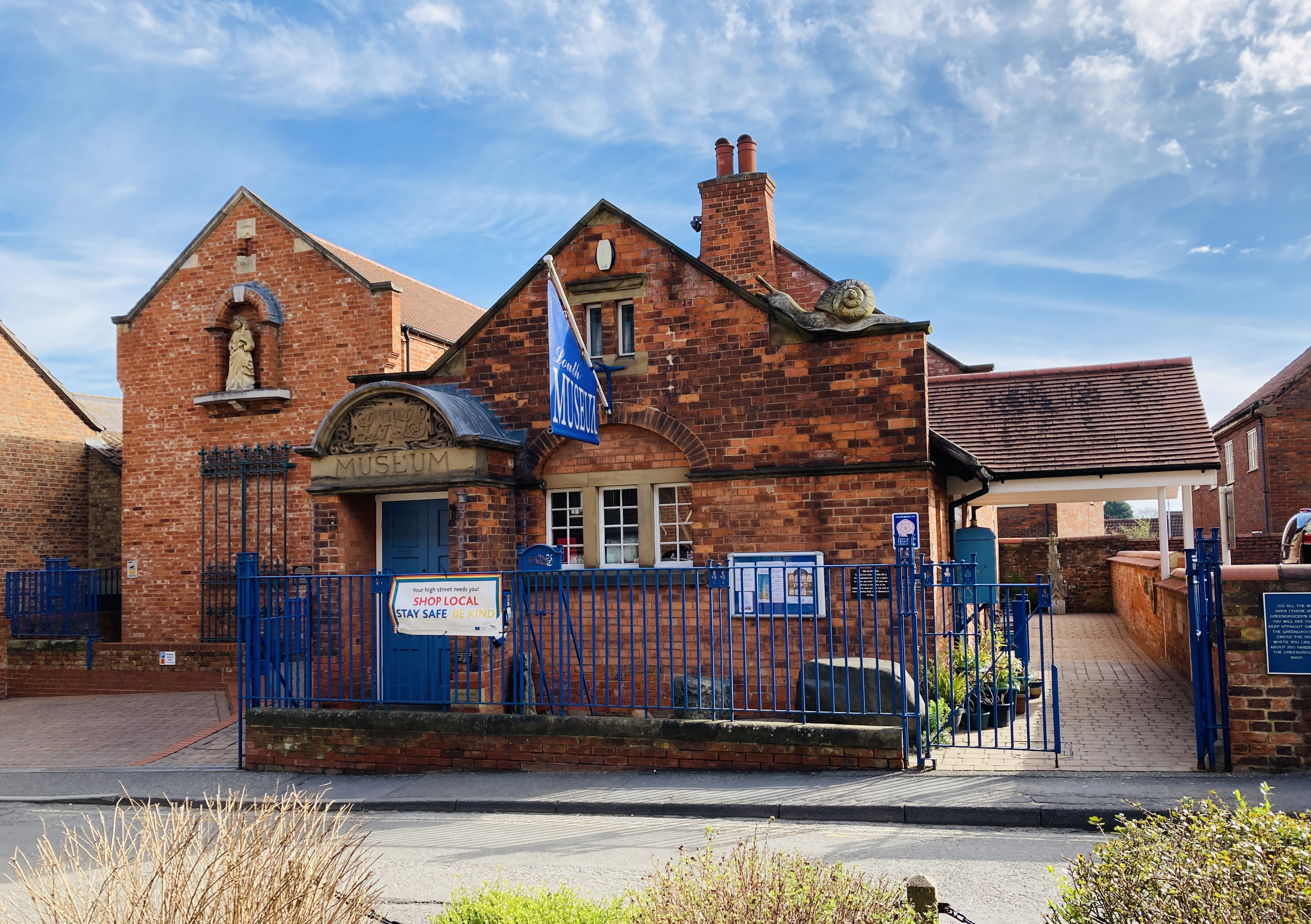
Louth Museum in 2023

Louth Museum is a visitor attraction in the historic market town of Louth in Lincolnshire, close to the Lincolnshire Wolds. Located at 4 Broadbank, Louth, LN11 0EQ, the museum has four galleries, a library which doubles as a space for exhibitions, and a gift shop. Among its displays is the largest national collection of woodcarvings by the prize-winning Victorian sculptor and carver Thomas Wilkinson Wallis. Louth Museum is normally open from April to October each year, Wednesday to Saturday, from 10 am to 4 pm. There is a small admission charge while children go free.

== History ==
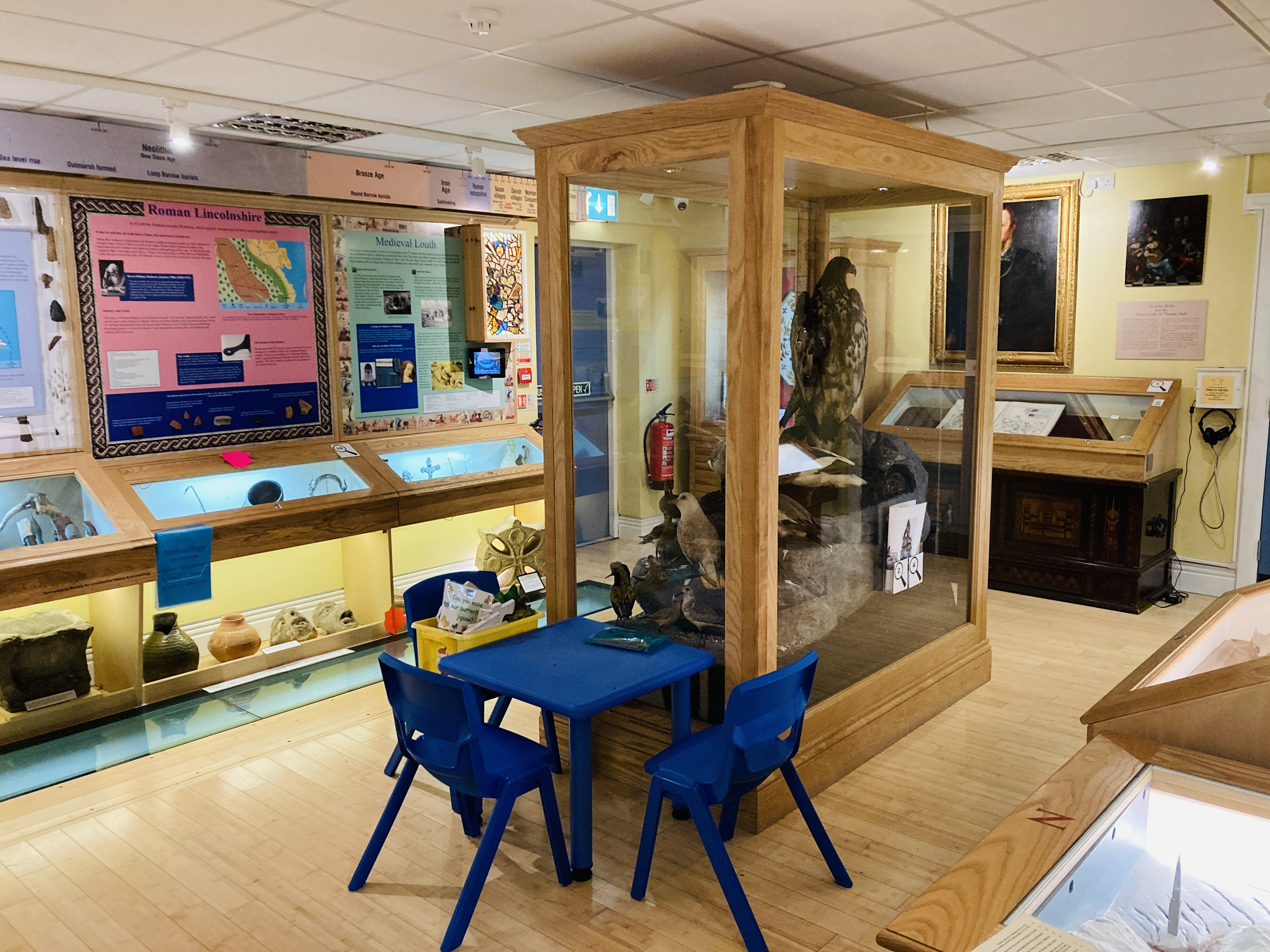
An exhibition gallery in Louth Museum

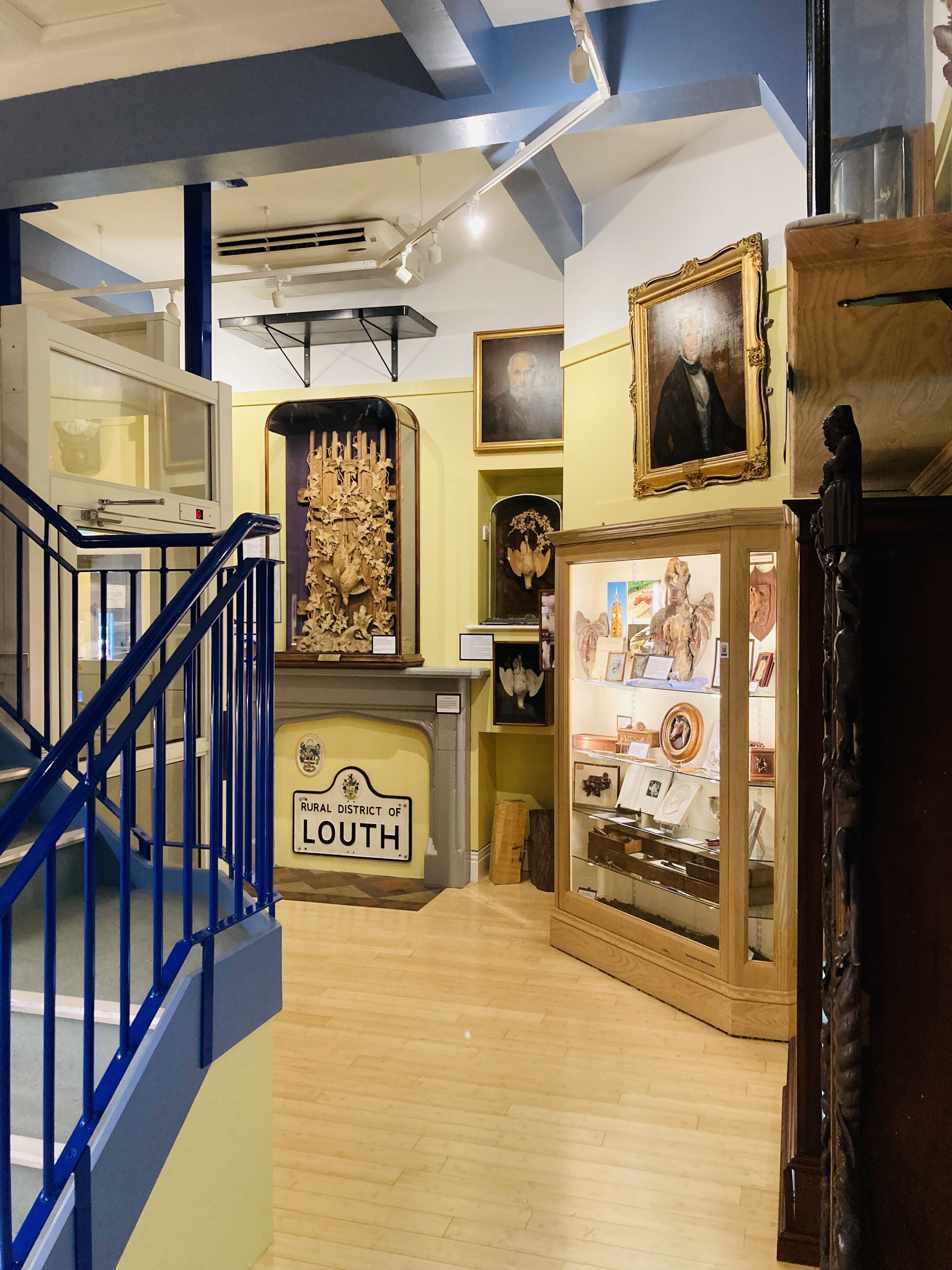
An exhibition gallery in Louth Museum

The Louth Naturalists' Antiquarian and Literary Society was founded in 1884 and the Society has run Louth Museum since 1910. The award-winning museum was designed by John James Cresswell in 1910.

The museum's first Curator was Charles Smith Carter (1865-1933). A boot-maker by trade, C. S. Carter was the first and longest serving Curator of Louth Museum. He became interested in archaeology while finding stone tools in Kent. After moving to Louth he discovered evidence of Neolithic settlements at Tathwell and Kelstern. The collecting of stonetools remained one of Carter's great passions throughout his life. The museum holds a number of his notebooks and many of his original collections are on display.

== Galleries and exhibits ==
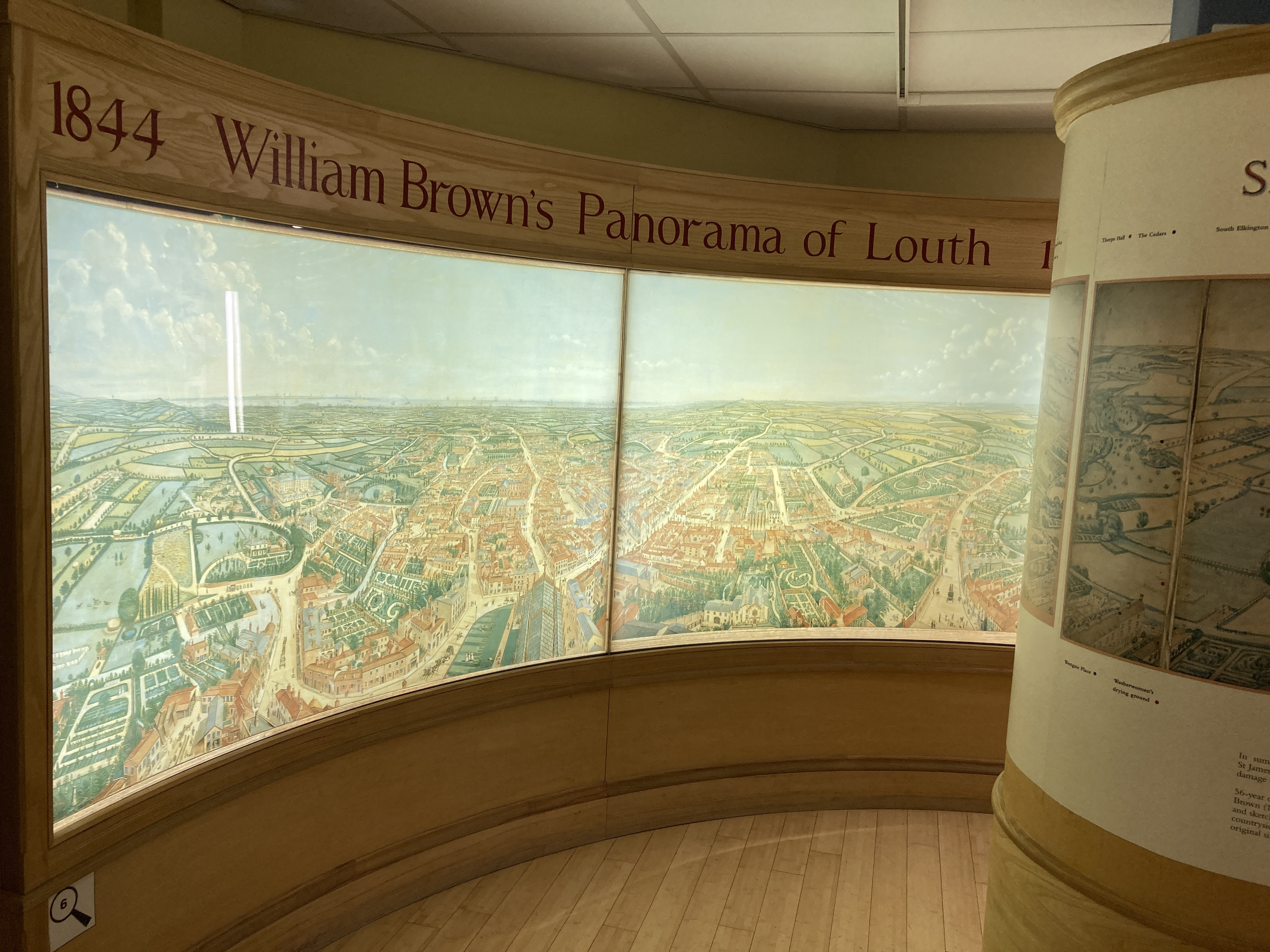
Replica of William Brown's Panorama of Louth (1844-47)

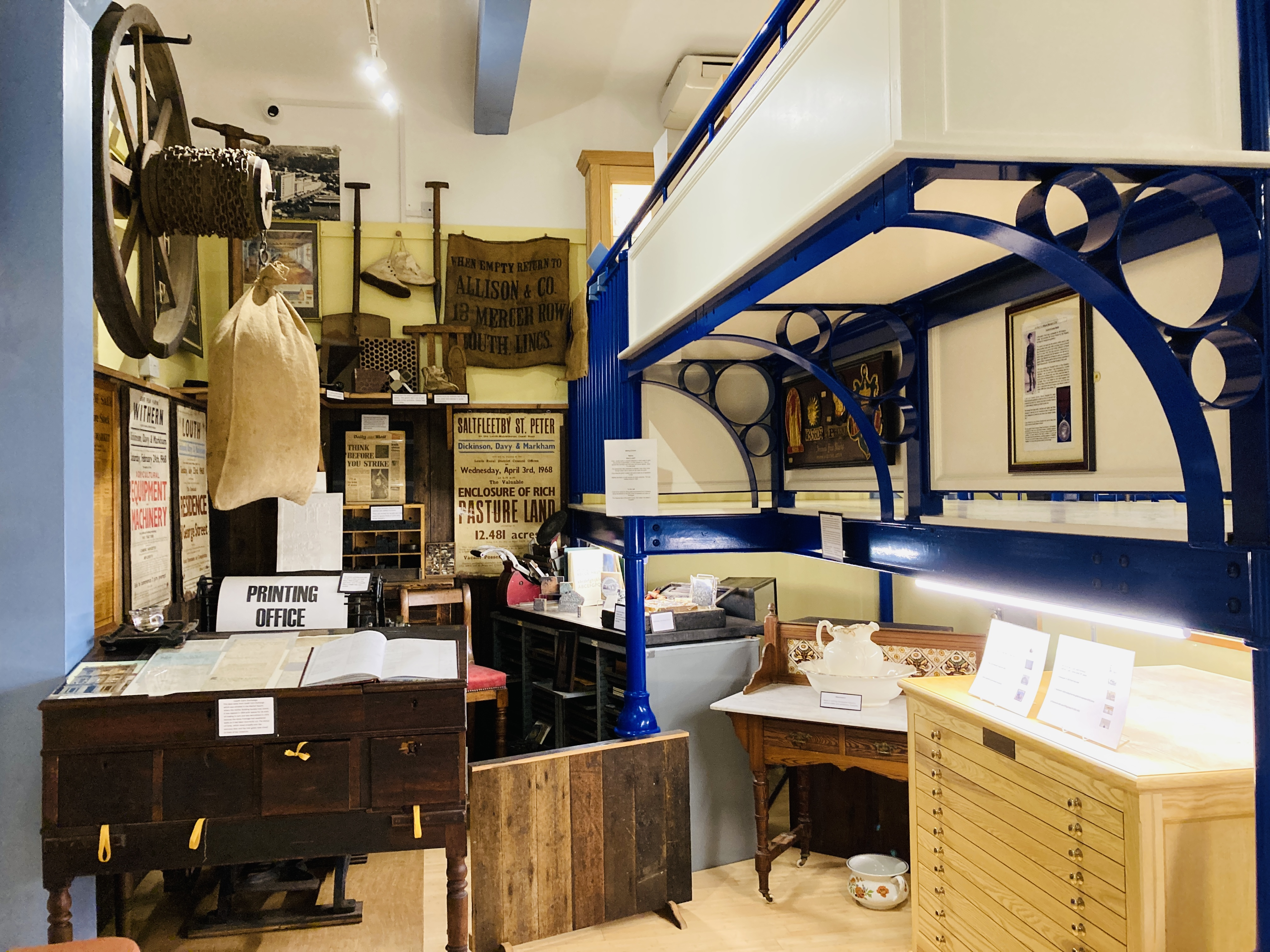
An exhibition gallery in Louth Museum

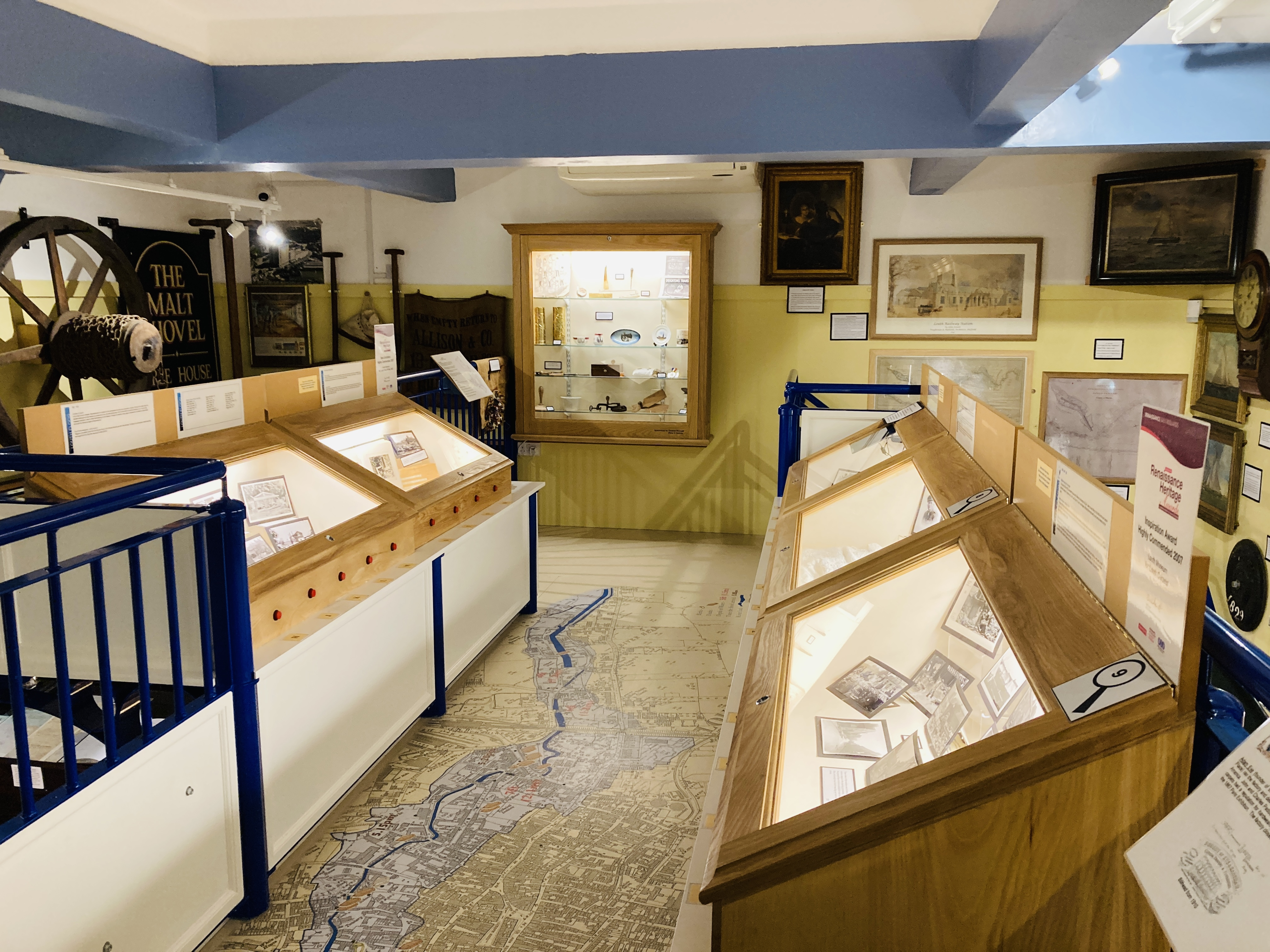
An exhibition gallery in Louth Museum

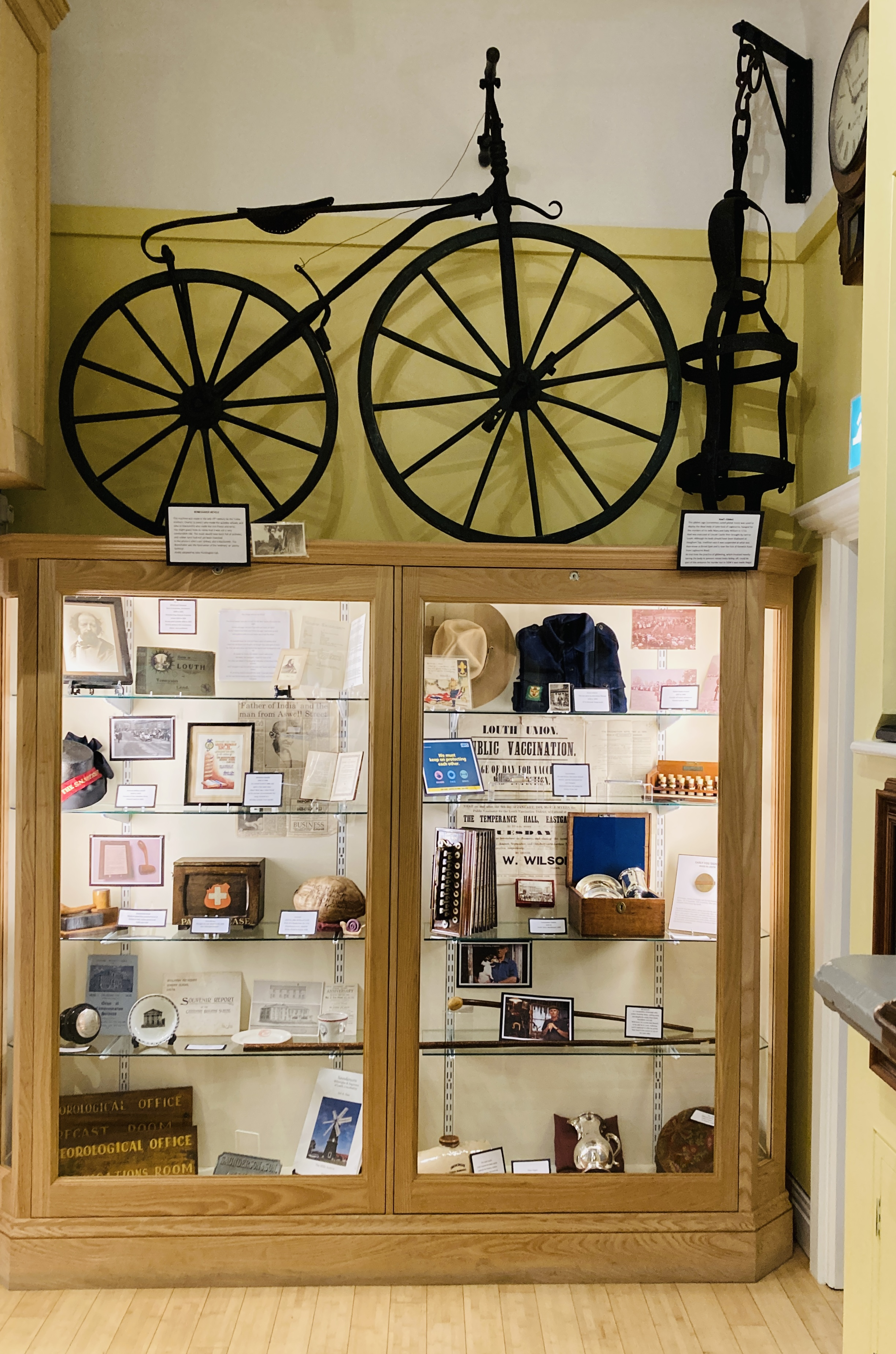
A display cabinet with Keal's Gibbet above in Louth Museum

Galleries at the museum cover 200,000 years of local archaeology and history, including fossils, the disastrous Louth Flood of 1920 and the story of the Ghost of the Green Lady of Thorpe Hall. The museum's Panorama Gallery displays two back-lit copies of William Brown's Panorama of Louth as viewed from the top of St James' spire in 1844. Brown's original panoramic paintings from which the display is formed were painted between 1844 and 1847 and today the two paintings hang together in Louth Town Hall. Brown's detailed artwork reveals the people, businesses and buildings of Louth as it was in 1844, and shows the landscape as far as the North Sea to the east and northwards to the Humber Estuary and beyond.

One notable object on display is Keal's Gibbet, a cage which displayed the dead body of John Keal from Legbourne, who was hanged for the murders of his wife Mary and son William in 1731. Keal was executed at Lincoln Castle then his corpse was brought by cart to Louth where it was suspended at what was then known as Broad Spot and which is now the fork of Kenwick Road. Other exhibits include displays on Stone Age and Roman finds, local bricks and brick-making, Louth's flat-weave carpets and locally made crested china.

Art UK registers at least 77 artworks at the museum.

== Thomas Wilkinson Wallis ==
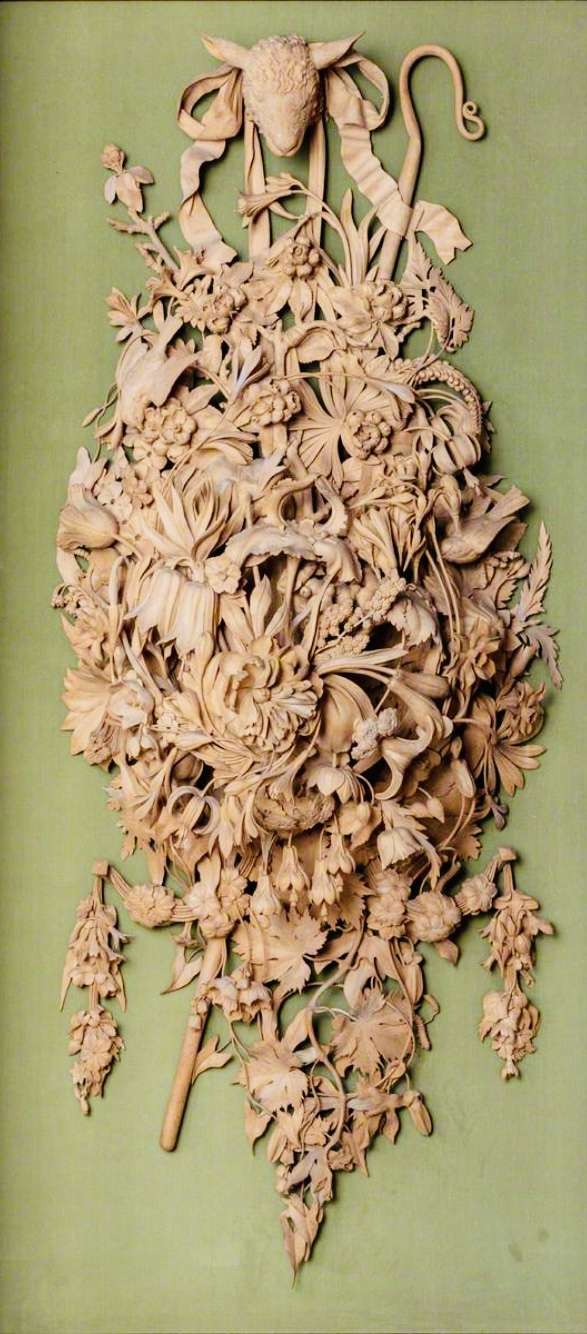
The prize-winning 'Trophy of Spring', carved by Wallis in 1851

The museum holds the largest collection of carvings and paintings by the noted sculptor and carver Thomas Wilkinson Wallis (1821-1903), who for much of his life lived nearby on Gospelgate. This collection is of national importance.

Wallis specialised in carving realistic wooden trophies of dead birds, in particular game birds, as well as intricately carving fruit, flowers and foliage in limewood from a clay model. His method was to first make a model of the proposed carving in pipe-clay on a wire frame before making the carving from a single block of limewood. Wallis sold his first piece of 'fancy carving' in 1846 for £2 to a Mr Tuke of York. He also drew architectural views which he reproduced as lithographs. He went on to create about seventy carvings of outstanding quality, usually of dead birds and foliage, from a single piece of limewood, mainly to commission. In 1850 Wallis received a silver medal for his wood carving from the Royal Society of Arts, and was awarded a Prize medal for his exhibits of wood carving at the Great Exhibition of 1851. Here his carvings included 'Trophy of Spring', a group of three dead game birds: a partridge, woodcock and snipe which took eight months to carve, in addition to a golden plover with an ivy branch, and two carvings of flowers and fruit. He was awarded further medals at the Paris Exhibition of 1855 and the 1862 International Exhibition. The renowned artist and critic John Ruskin favourably compared the work of Wallis to that of Grinling Gibbons.

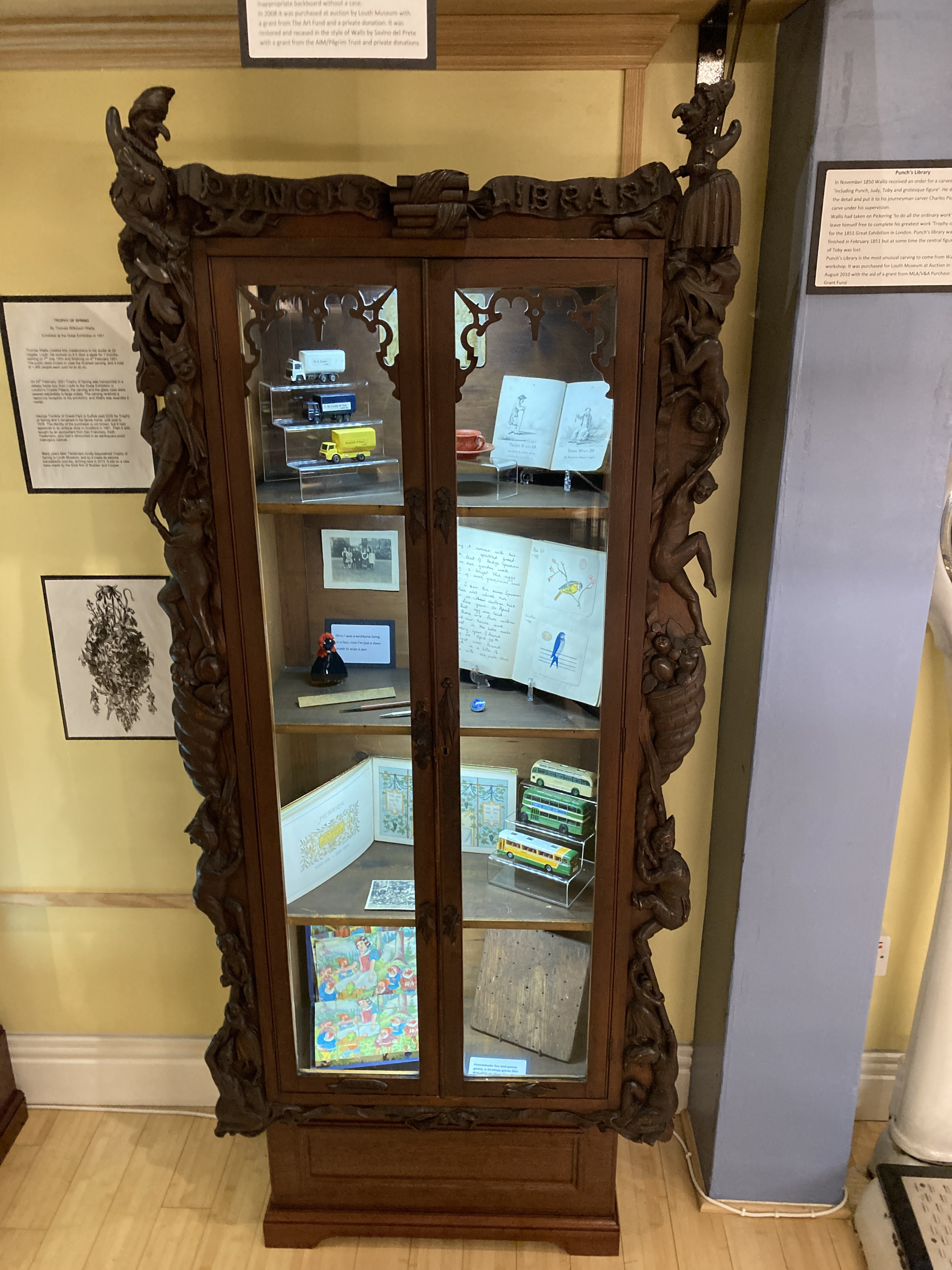
The carved bookcase 'Punch's Library' displayed in Louth Museum

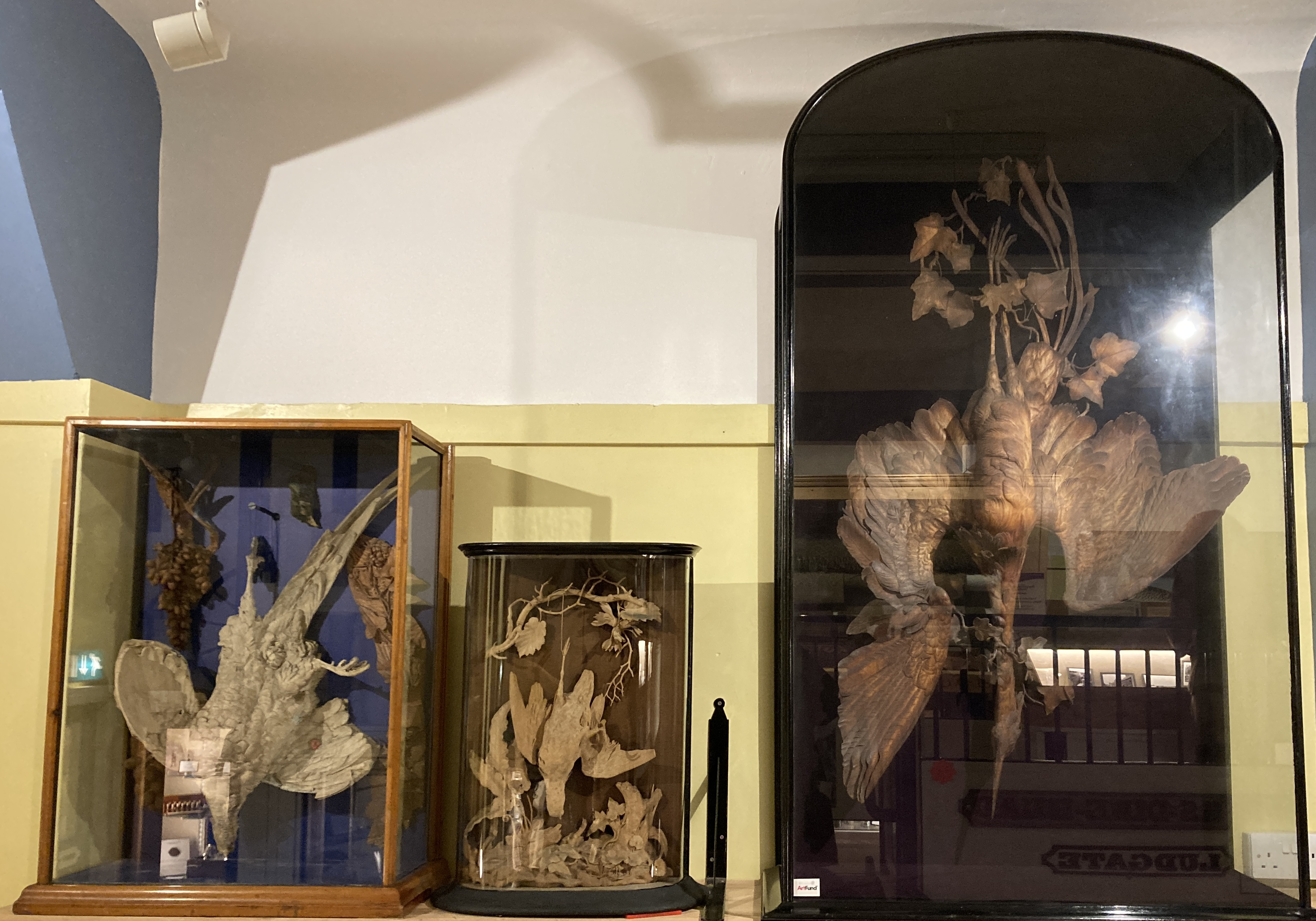
Display of carvings by Wallis in Louth Museum

In November 1850 Wallis received an order for a carved bookcase 'including Punch, Judy, Toby and grotesque figure'. He designed the detail and put it to his journeyman carver Charles Picking to carve under his supervision. Wallis had taken on Pickering 'to do all the ordinary work' to leave himself free to complete his greatest work, 'Trophy of Spring', for the 1851 Great Exhibition in London. The carving of 'Punch's Library' was finished in February 1851 but at some time the central figure of Toby is now lost. 'Punch's Library' is the most unusual carving to come from Wallis's workshop. It was purchased for Louth Museum at auction in August 2010 with the aid of a grant from MLA/V&A Purchase Grant Fund.

His carving 'Trophy of Spring' is the most recent item in the collection, having been donated to the museum in 2015. It arrived from California, complete with its earthquake-proof cabinet, standing 5 feet high.
