= Sigeferth =

10th-century Bishop of Lindsey

- Bishop of Lindsey
- Appointed: before 996
- Term ended: after 1004
- Predecessor: Leofwine
- Successor: last bishop

Orders
- Consecration: before 996

Personal details
- Died: after 1004
- Denomination: Christian

Sigeferth was a medieval Bishop of Lindsey.

Sigeferth was consecrated before 996. He died after 1004. This was a revival of the see, which had lapsed during the Danish invasions.

== Citations ==
Christian titles
Preceded by Leofwine	Bishop of Lindsey before 996–after 1004	Succeeded by last bishop
