= Edgar of Lindsey =

7th and 8th-century Bishop of Lindsey

Edgar
- Bishop of Lindsey
- In office: perhaps 693
- Predecessor: Æthelwine
- Successor: Cyneberht

Orders
- Consecration: perhaps 693

Personal details
- Died: between 716 and 731
- Denomination: Christian

Edgar (or Eadgar) was a medieval Bishop of Lindsey.

Edgar was consecrated possibly in 693. He died between 716 and 731.

== Citations ==
Christian titles
Preceded by Æthelwine	Bishop of Lindsey ?693–c. 724	Succeeded by Cyneberht
