= Thomas Wilkinson Wallis =

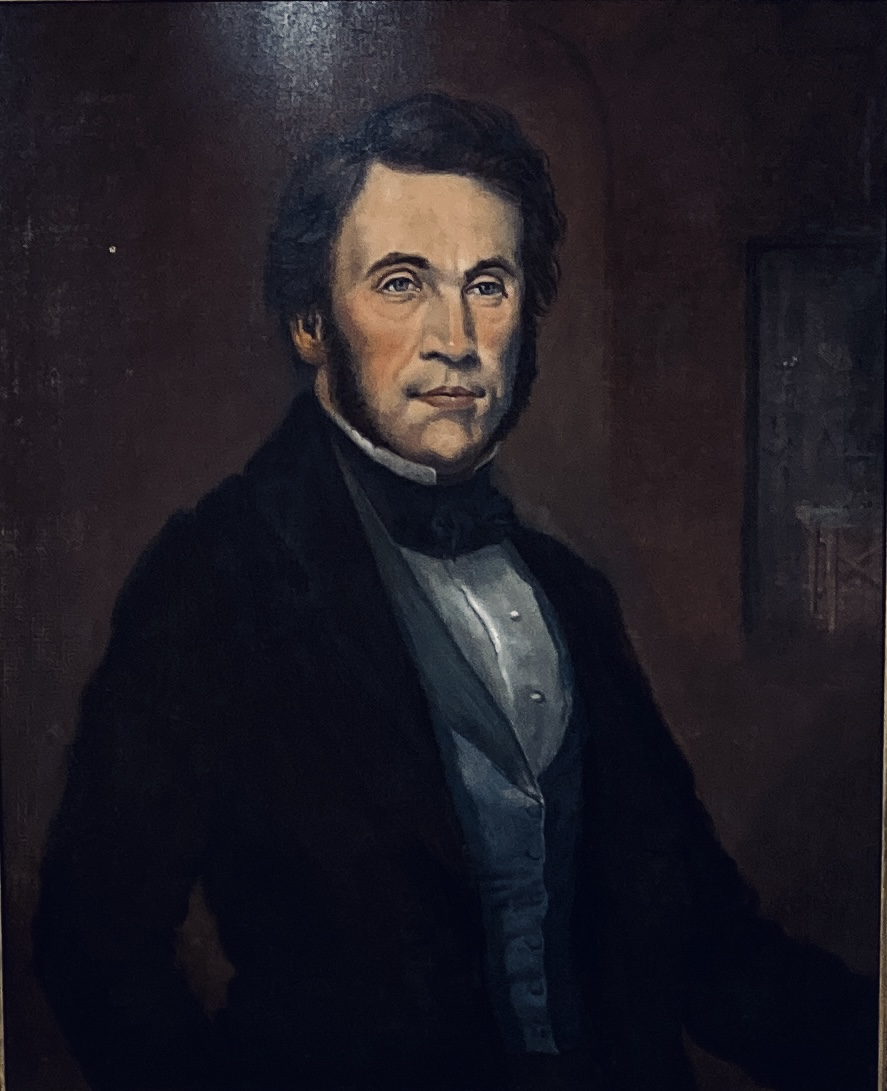
Thomas Wilkinson Wallis - self portrait

Thomas Wilkinson Wallis (4 February 1821–26 August 1903) was a British woodcarver, sculptor, artist, surveyor and public health inspector of the Victorian era referred to as "the Grinling Gibbons of the 19th-century".

== Early life ==
T. W. Wallis was born into an impoverished family in Hull in Yorkshire in 1821, the eighth child of Ann Emerson Wallis (1783–1878) and the cabinet-maker, bookkeeper and grocer Samuel Wallis (1788–1869). At birth he was a weak child, and was not expected to survive more than a few months. When the family was made almost bankrupt through an unsuccessful ship-owning venture, aged 9, and after just three years of a rudimentary education, Wallis began a series of menial and unpleasant jobs including working as an errand boy before serving an apprenticeship from 1834 to 1841 as a carver and gilder to Thomas Ward in Hull. The first three of the seven years were unpaid, and, during this period, acutely aware of his lack of education, Wallis began a life-long membership of the Mechanics' Institute.

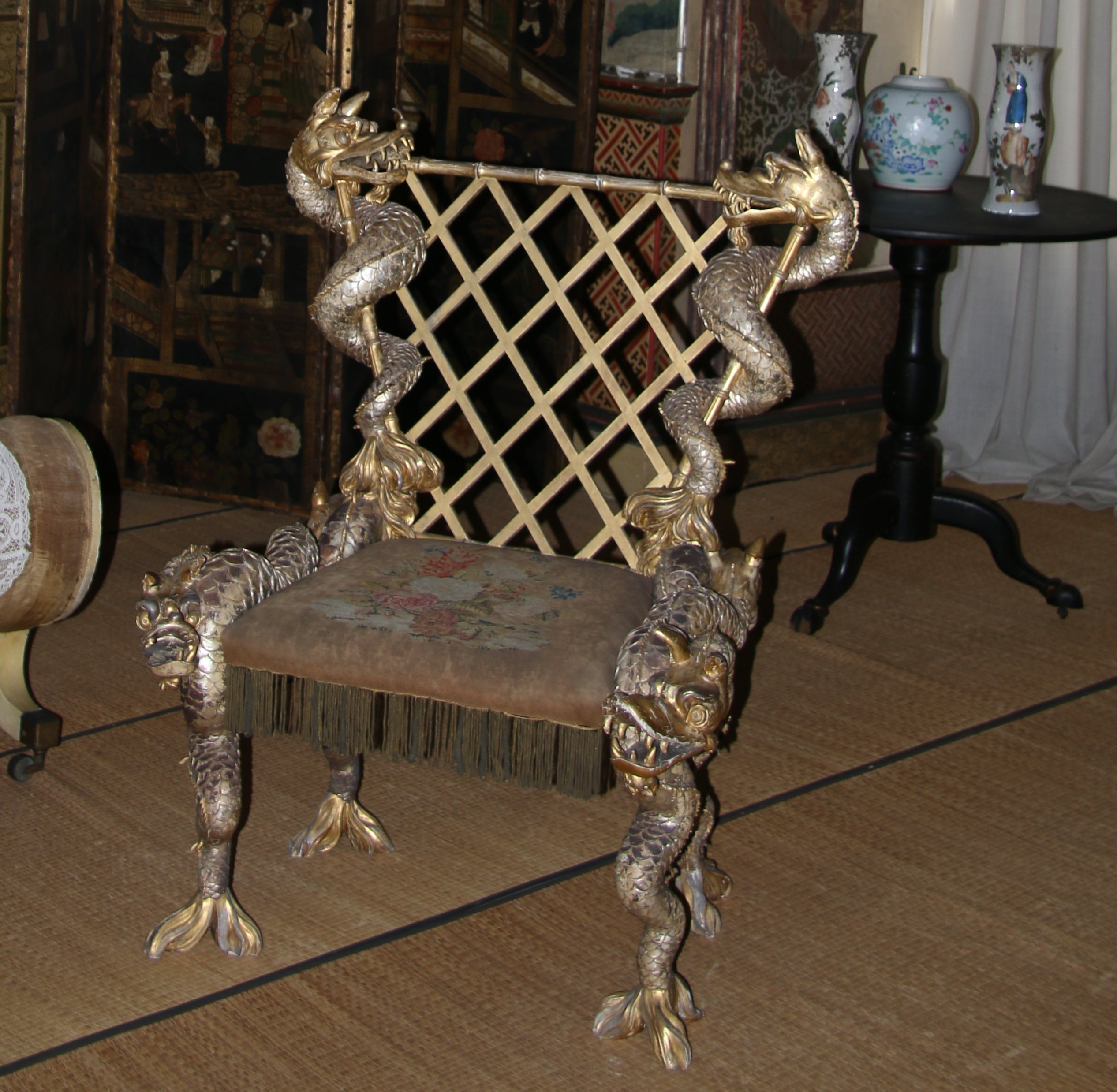
The 'Dragon Chair' was carved by Wallis in 1841 for Burton Constable Hall

By his sixteenth birthday, he had demonstrated sufficient skill and maturity to be allowed to assist Ward in carrying out work at Burton Constable Hall. After completion of his seven years, and having accepted Ward's offer of the position of journeyman at 24 shillings (£1.20) per week, in 1841 Wallis was engaged to carve a 'Dragon Chair' to a design by Lady Constable. In 1842 he worked for six weeks for Constantine and Co. in Leeds, where his older brother, Samuel Wallis (c.1812-1873), was employed as foreman of the carving shop.

== Move to Louth ==
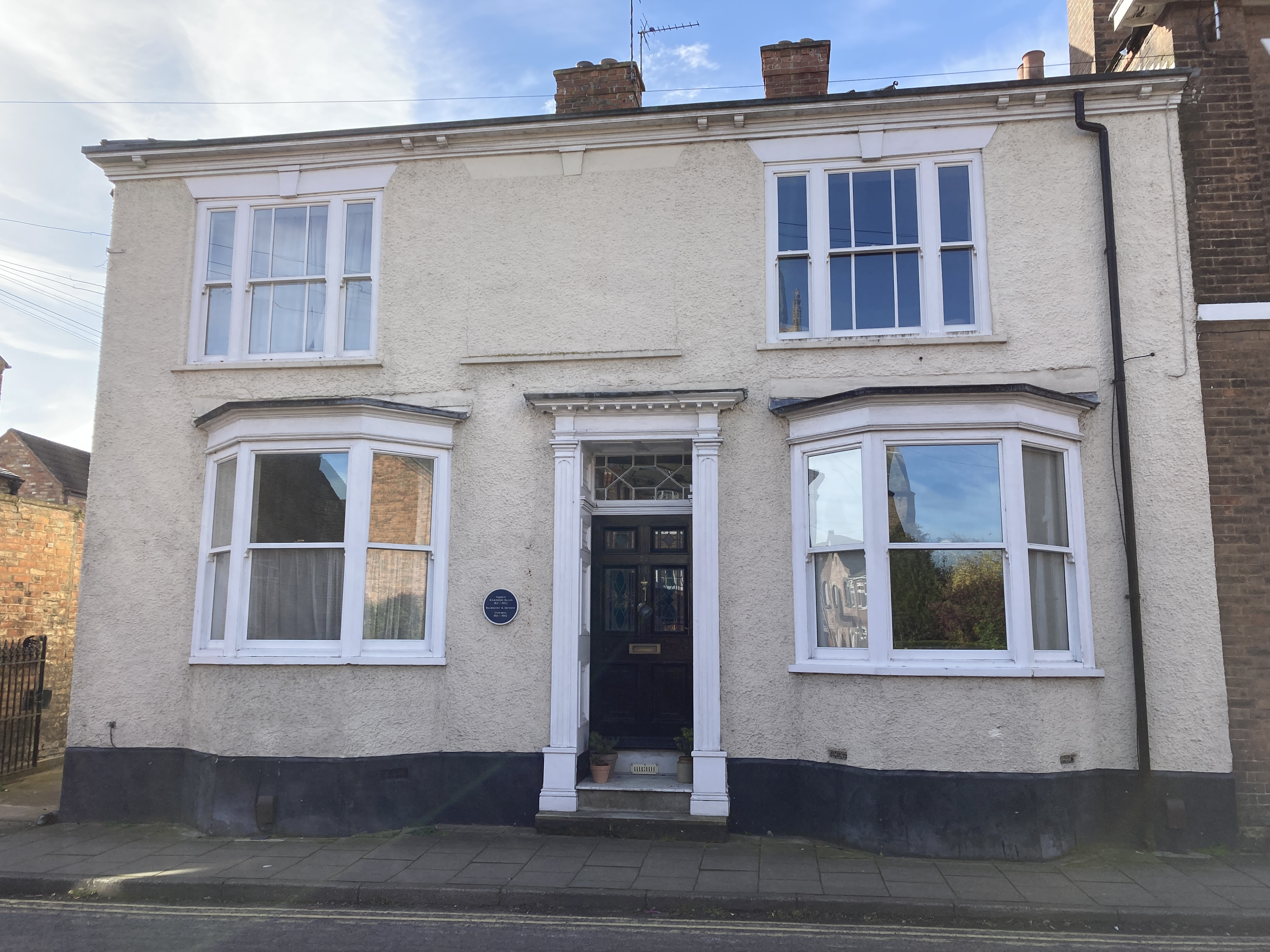
The home of T. W. Wallis at 10 Gospelgate in Louth, Lincolnshire (1851–1903)

After working for three years as a journeyman carver Wallis moved to Louth in Lincolnshire to work for the gilder John Brown of Upgate. When Brown died in 1844, Wallis took over his workshop and continued to live and work in Louth for the rest of his life. In 1845 he married Susanna Crow (1822–1866) of Louth and from 1851 to his death he lived on Gospelgate in the town. Through his daughter Ann Palmer Wallis he had a grandson, the Louth-born Harry Wallis Kew (1868–1948), who became a founder of the Louth Naturalists' Antiquarian and Literary Society in 1884 which has run Louth Museum since 1910.

== Wood carving career ==
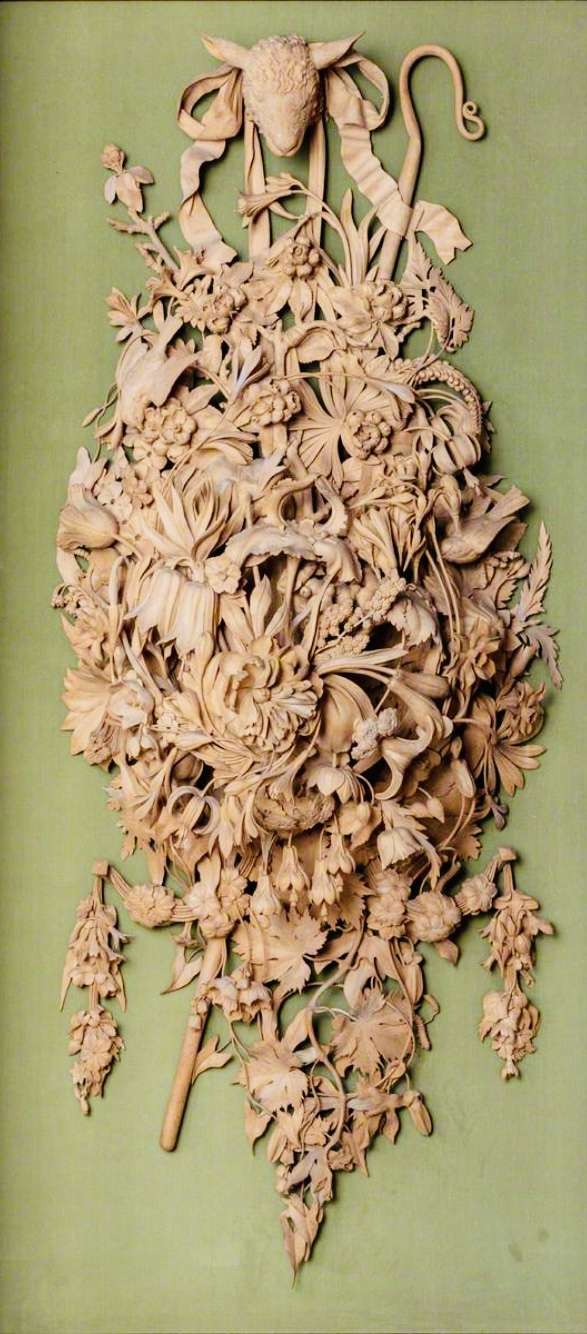
The prize-winning 'Trophy of Spring', carved by Wallis in 1851

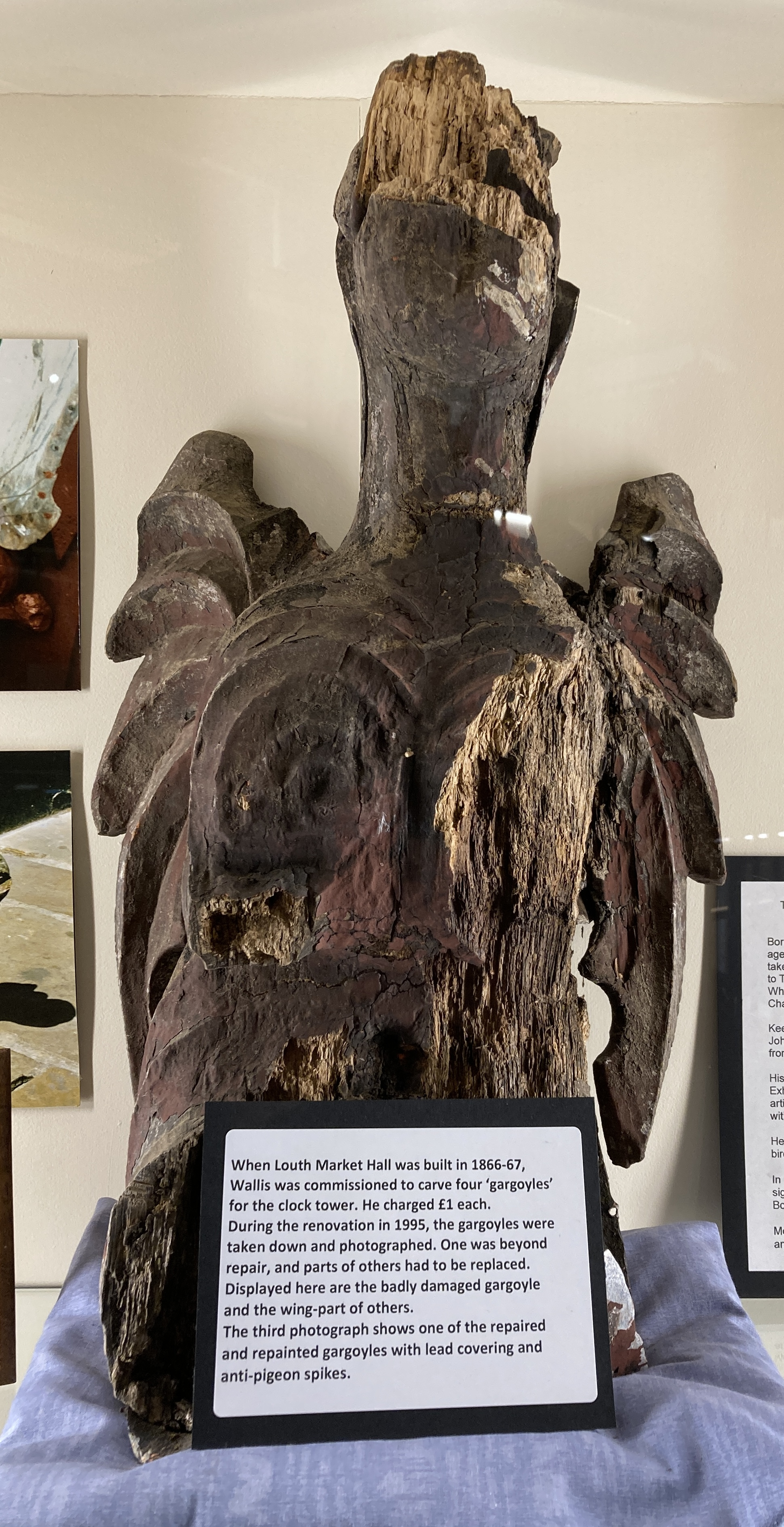
Remains of a wooden gargoyle carved by Wallis for Louth Market Hall (1866–67)

Wallis specialised in carving realistic wooden trophies of dead birds, in particular game birds, as well as intricately carving fruit, flowers and foliage in limewood from a clay model. His method was to first make a model of the proposed carving in pipe-clay on a wire frame before making the carving from a single block of limewood. Wallis sold his first piece of 'fancy carving' in 1846 for £2 to a Mr Tuke of York. He also drew architectural views which he reproduced as lithographs. He went on to create about seventy carvings of outstanding quality, usually of dead birds and foliage, from a single piece of limewood, mainly to commission. In 1850 Wallis received a silver medal for his wood carving from the Royal Society of Arts, and in the same year he became Honorary Curator of Louth Mechanics’ Institute. He was awarded a Prize medal for his exhibits of wood carving at the Great Exhibition of 1851. Here his carvings included 'Trophy of Spring', a group of three dead game birds: a partridge, woodcock and snipe which took eight months to carve, in addition to a golden plover with an ivy branch, and two carvings of flowers and fruit. He was awarded further medals at the Paris Exhibition of 1855 and the 1862 International Exhibition. The renowned artist and critic John Ruskin favourably compared the work of Wallis to that of Grinling Gibbons.

When Louth Market Hall was built in 1866–67, Wallis was commissioned to carve four wooden 'gargoyles' for the clock tower. He charged £1 each. During the renovation in 1995, the gargoyles were taken down and photographed. One was beyond repair, and parts of others had to be replaced. The photograph shows the remains of the badly damaged gargoyle, now displayed in Louth Museum.

== Later years ==
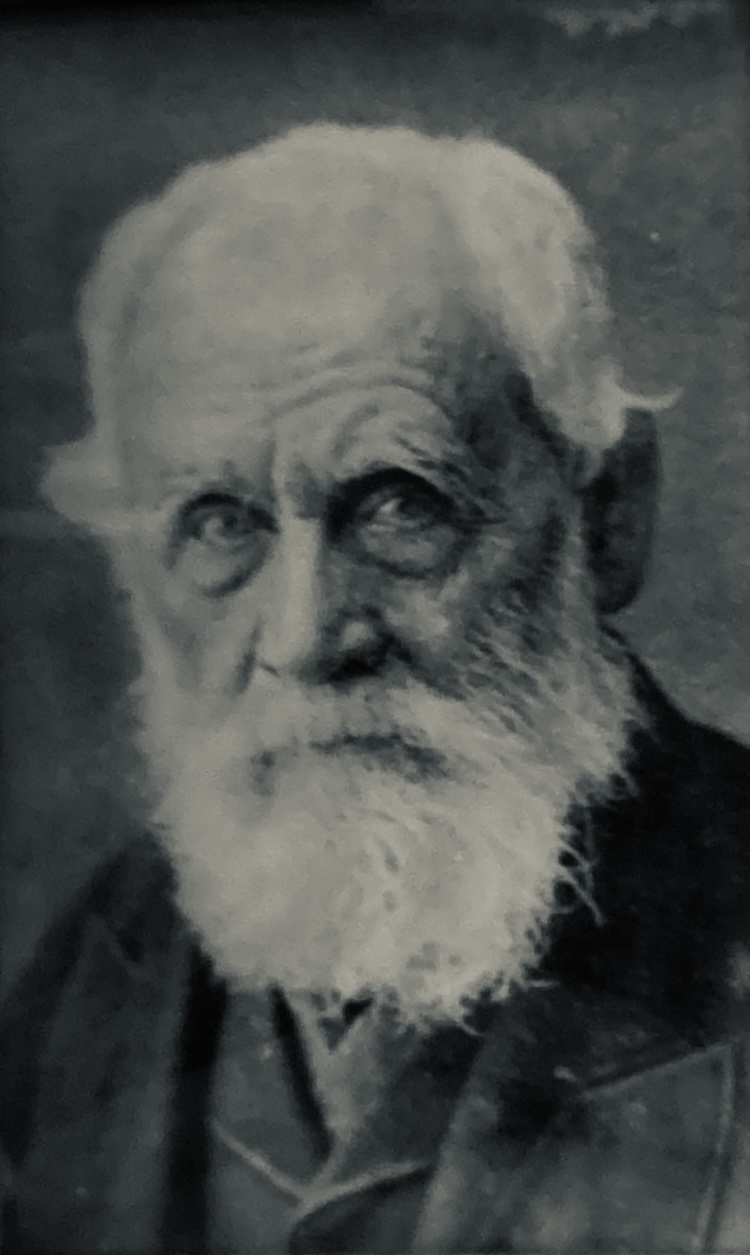
Wallis in 1899 aged 78

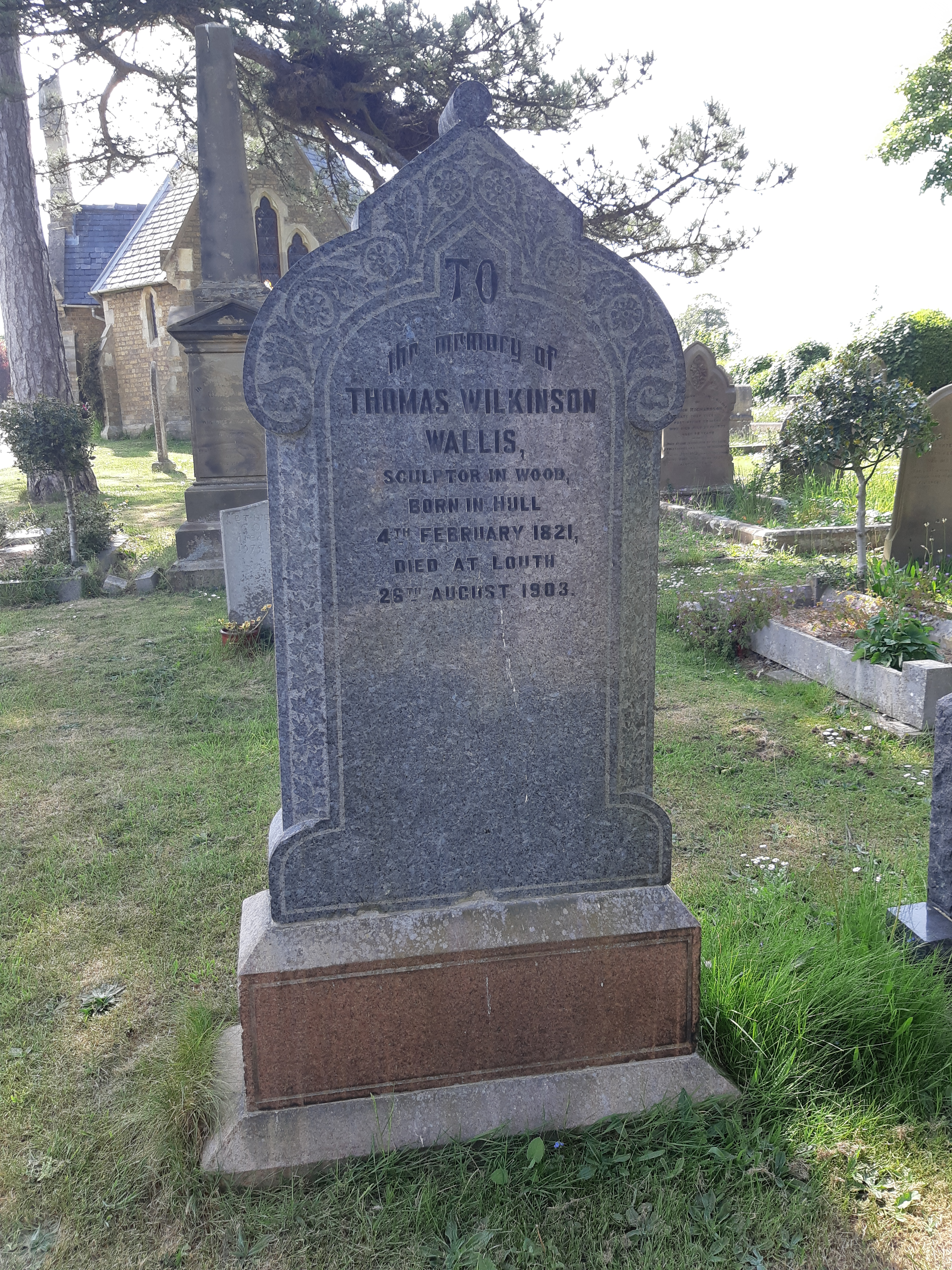
The grave of T. W. Wallis in Louth Cemetery

Louth Museum in Louth, where he made his home, holds the largest collection of his carvings, including his most famous work, 'Trophy of Spring'; also here are his carving of a heron with bulrush and ivy executed in 1853, together with the clay model used as the basis or plan for this carving; the Ailsa Woodcock (1854); 'Partridges and Ivy', a brace of partridges with ivy carved in 1856. In 1858 Wallis damaged his eyes while observing an eclipse through inadequately smoked glass, and fear of permanently losing his sight caused him to finally abandon his career as a carver in 1874. He was appointed the public health inspector and Borough Surveyor for Louth (1873–1893), having taught himself land surveying. He did work for the Drainage Commissioners. In 1895 he was awarded the long service silver medal for serving as Quartermaster Sergeant of the Louth Volunteers for 20 years. In 1899 Wallis published his autobiography, based on extracts from his journal. In this Wallis lists 72 principal carvings, including gargoyles he carved for Louth Market Hall in 1867. To celebrate his 80th birthday in 1901 the sculptor Harry Hems wrote an appreciation which was published in The British Architect.

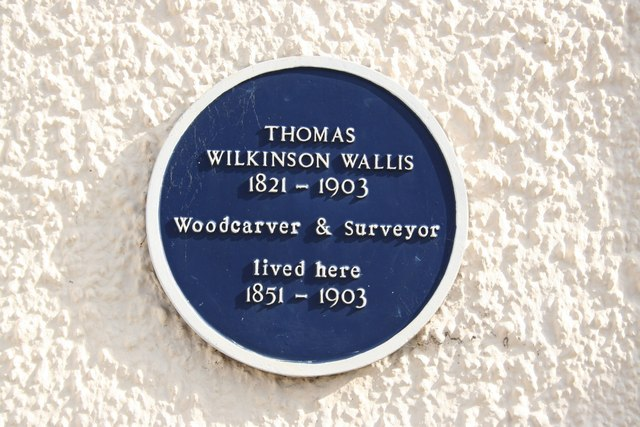
The blue plaque on the former home of T. W. Wallis on Gospelgate in Louth, Lincolnshire

Wallis died in Louth in August 1903 aged 82 and was buried in Louth Cemetery. He left an estate valued at £1,232 15s. 9d. His former home at 10 Gospelgate in Louth has a blue plaque commemorating his residence there.

== Legacy ==
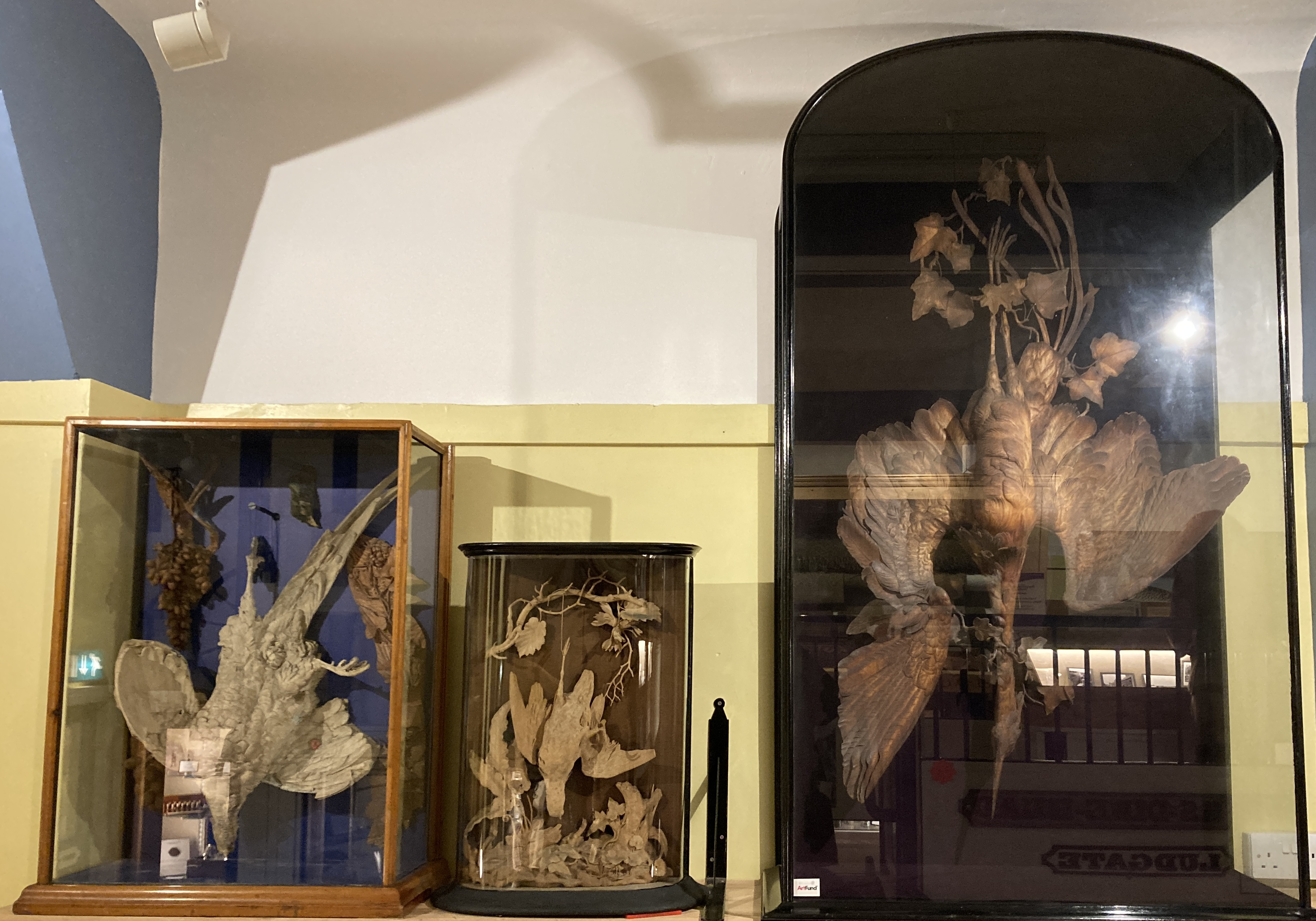
Display of carvings by Wallis in Louth Museum

An 1853 carving by Wallis in limewood depicting his by now common theme of a woodcock, partridge and a snipe hanging by their feet from two intertwined branches, the whole mounted and encased in a glass display cabinet is in the collection of the Victoria and Albert Museum in London. Other examples of his work are displayed in St James' Church in Louth, where the pulpit is an example of his work, Louth Town Hall, the Usher Gallery in Lincoln and Hereford Museum and Art Gallery.
