= St James' Church, Louth =

Church in Lincolnshire, England

- St James' Church
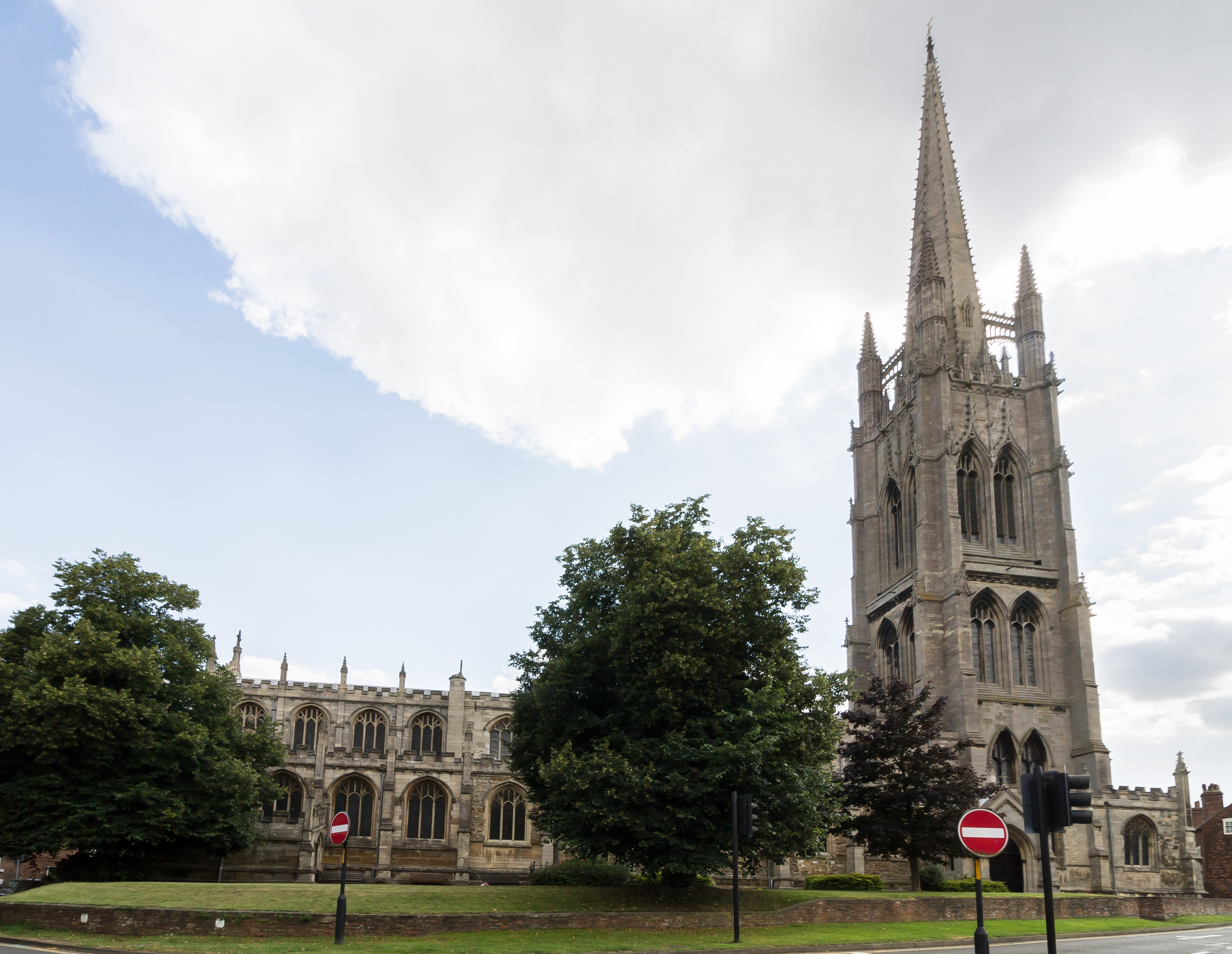
- The church and its spire

- Location within Lincolnshire
- 53.3666°N 0.0080°W
- OS grid reference: TF 32636 87381
- Location: Louth, East Lindsey
- Country: England
- Denomination: Church of England
- Churchmanship: Broad Church
- Website: St James' Church

History
- Status: Active
- Dedication: James, son of Zebedee

Architecture
- Functional status: Active
- Heritage designation: Grade I listed
- Years built: 1430–1440 (Church body), 1501-1515 (Spire)

Specifications
- Length: 182 feet (55 m)

Administration
- Province: Canterbury
- Diocese: Lincoln
- Archdeaconry: Lincoln
- Deanery: Louthesk
- Parish: Louth

Clergy
- Rector: Mike Croft

St James' Church, Louth, is the Anglican parish church of Louth in Lincolnshire, England. It is notable for having the third tallest spire in the whole of the United Kingdom, and the tallest on an Anglican parish church. The church was the site of the start of the Lincolnshire Rising, starting in October 1536 and led by the vicar, who was hanged, drawn and quartered for his actions.

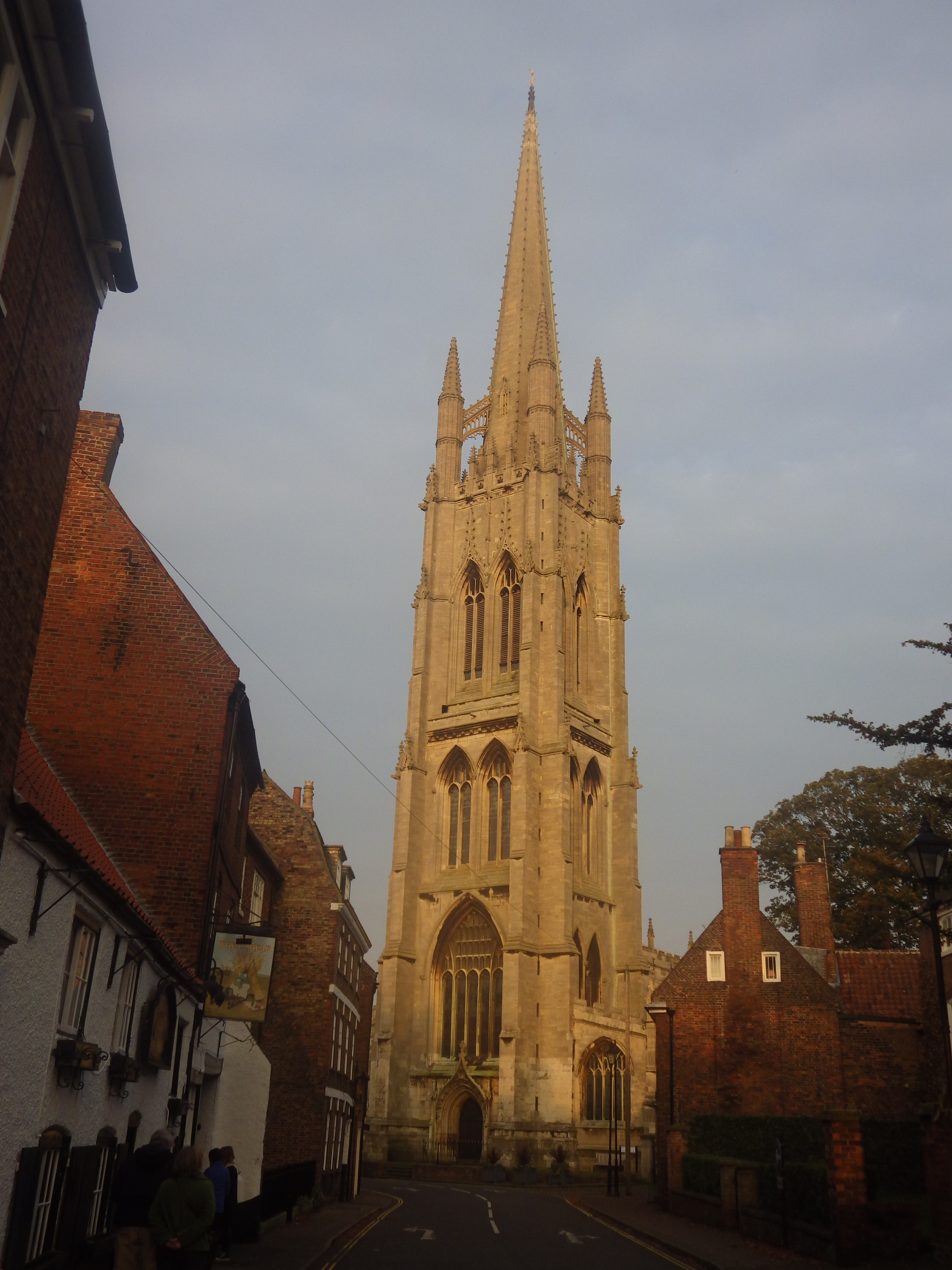
The tower and spire

== History ==
In 2015 researchers discovered two pieces of a stone pre-Conquest standing cross, dating to c.950, in the Rectory garden. In form the cross is of the 'ring' or 'wheel head' type, the central design being of Christ crucified. This type is more commonly seen today in Ireland. The cross suggests that Louth was a significant site in the tenth century, as the bishop of Lindsey promoted a market to reassert his authority after the disruptions of the Viking incursions. The Louth Cross is on display within the church.

The church is mainly 15th century and is the third building on the site, replacing 11th- and 13th-century buildings. The chancel and nave were re-built between 1430 and 1440. Originally the church had five subsidiary chapels and altars and a three-storey rood screen.

The building of the tower probably commenced in the 1440s or 1450s and was completed to its present height by 1499. Work began on the spire in 1501 and it was not finished until 1515. The master mason (and likely the designer) was John Cole, though he was replaced in 1505 by Christopher Scune, and then in 1515 by John Tempas of Boston. The weathercock was placed on the top of the spire amongst great rejoicing on the eve of Holy Cross Day, 13 September 1515. This 'wedercoke' had been made in Lincoln from a huge copper basin captured from the Scots at the Battle of Flodden in 1513. It was bought in York by Thomas Tayleyor, one of the churchwardens at St James'. The total cost of the spire alone was £305 8s 4d (equivalent to £285,800 in 2025).

The tower is of three stages externally, though only two internally. The lowest stage contains the west door and five-light west window, and rises to the height of the church body. The second stage forms a lantern, with windows on all sides, and is capped by a lierne vault at a height of 86 feet. A walkway runs around the tower at this stage. The top stage is set back and contains the ringing chamber, sound chamber and bell chamber. This stage has particularly attenuated proportions, and is derived architecturally from work in Yorkshire and at Durham Cathedral. At the very top of the tower are the squinches to carry the spire, and a rare medieval treadmill hoist called the 'Wild Mare'. This was installed in 1501-02 and was used in the erection of the spire. The tower is topped with an openwork embattled parapet and four octagonal corner pinnacles, each 43' 6" high. These bring the height of the tower proper to 196' 9".

The spire is of the octagonal parapet form. Though it has both broaches and flying buttresses linking it to the pinnacles, these are entirely ornamental. It is of unusually plain form, with just one tier of small lucarnes, another possible sign of Yorkshire influence. The structure is also exceptionally efficient, with the stonework being a maximum of twenty inches thick. This means that it weighs just 200 tons, less than the 290 tons of the corner pinnacles. The stonework rises to 287 feet 6 inches (87.63 m), while the top of the cockerel weather vane is 293 feet 1 inch (89.33 m) above the ground.

In October 1536, as a result of Henry VIII's ecclesiastical changes, people gathered in the church to start the Lincolnshire Rising, which was followed by the Pilgrimage of Grace. Neither succeeded and the church was stripped of its riches, including the rood screen, by the king's forces.

The spire's prodigious height made it vulnerable to the elements, being damaged by storms in 1558, 1587, 1634, 1828 and 1843, and restored each time.

The nave roof was replaced in 1825. The spire was restored between 1844 and 1845 by Lewis Nockalls Cottingham.

A further restoration took place between 1861 and 1869 by James Fowler, known as 'Fowler of Louth'. The clerestories and arcades were cleaned and underpinned. A new south porch was erected. The church was refitted with open seats of oak; the Corporation stalls being of the same material. The pulpit was carved by T. W. Wallis. The floors were laid with Minton tiles, designed by the architect. A new heating system by Hayden and Son of Trowbridge was installed with the boiler in a newly constructed vault. A stained glass window, the gift of J. L. Fytche, was fixed on the east end of the south aisle. Another window, by Clayton and Bell, was to be placed at the west end of the north aisle, in memory of General Sir George Patey. The total cost of the works was around £6,000 (equivalent to £620,000 in 2025). The church was re-opened on 5 August 1869 in the presence of the Bishop of Lincoln.

In 1937, the church flew the highest flag in Lincolnshire to mark the coronation of George VI. Later that year, renovation work commenced on the spire, under the supervision of architect Mr. Goddard, who had previously worked on Lincoln Cathedral.

In 2017 funding was raised to fit a viewing door to the cell just below the spire floor, enabling the viewing of the 'Wild Mare' treadmill.

== Dedication ==
The church is dedicated to James, son of Zebedee. In the Middle Ages, this saint was the focus of a major pilgrimage route to Santiago de Compostela in Spain.

== Incumbents ==
=== Vicars ===
- 1200 Jordan, Priest
- 1247 Herueus (Harvey)
- 1276 Gilbert de Tetilthorp
- 1278 Master Richard de Welleton, Chaplain
- 1294 William de Leycton
- 1328 Robert de Foston, Deacon
- 1345 John de Waynflet
- 1349 Thomas de Kele
- 1368 Robert de Bloxham
- 1369 John de Harhill
- Simon Waynflete (over 20 years)
- 1421 Thomas Gedeney (Gednay) (20 years)
- 1443–44 Master John Sudbury
- 1461–62 Dom. Thomas Sudbury
- 1502 Master Richard Barnyngham (Bernyngham)
- 1514 Master Thomas Egleston
- 1527 Master George Thomson
- 1534 Master Thomas Kendall
- 1537 Geoffrey Baily (Baylie)
- 1549 John Louth
- 1558–59 Robert Doughty
- 1600 James Calfhill
- 1601 Alexander Cooke
- 1604 John Melton (still signing registers in 1636)
- Richard Smith
- 1630 Paul Glisson
- 1654 Henry Gray
- 1656 Henry Daile
- Francis Castillion
- 1668 Samuel Adcock
- 1671 William Wetherell
- Samuel Nicholls (not instituted)
- 1704 William Richardson
- 1711 Charles L'Oste
- 1730 Stephen Ashton
- 1764 Stephen Fytche
- 1780 Wolley Jolland
- 1831 Edward Reginald Mantell

=== Rectors ===
In 1859 the income of the vicarage was augmented by an Order in Council by amalgamating it with revenues of the associated canonry of Lincoln Cathedral, the benefice becoming a rectory in its own right. The vicar in post became the new Rector of Louth and held the associated canonry from that point onwards. During the 19th and early 20th centuries the parish was divided to create two new parishes, of which the Rector of Louth was the patron. From 1928 the Rector of Louth was held together with the post of Rector of Welton le Wold. In 1974 the benefice became part of a Team Ministry serving the newly created Parish of Louth which incorporated these parishes (St Michael's and Holy Trinity) with those of South and North Elkington, Keddington and Stewton. Since that time the Rector of Louth has been Team Rector of the Team Ministry.

- 1859 Albert Sydney Wilde
- 1915 Arthur Duncan-Jones, later Vicar of St Mary's, Primrose Hill and Dean of Chichester
- 1916 Charles Lenton
- 1928 Humphrey Phillipps Walcot Burton
- 1952 Aidan Crawley Pulleine Ward
- 1969 Michael Edgar Adie, afterwards become Archdeacon of Lincoln and then Bishop of Guildford
- 1977 David William Owen
- 1993 Stephen Douglas Holdaway
- 2013 Nicholas James Watson Brown
- 2021 John Cameron Watt

== Bells ==
There is a peal of eight bells. They were recast in 1726 by Daniel Hedderly. In 1798 the great bell was cracked when it was rung to celebrate Nelson's victory in the Battle of the Nile. They were rehung in 1957, and the treble and two were recast. They have subsequently been refurbished and rehung in 2022. The peal is the eighth heaviest in England.

== Tower clock ==
The clock in the tower was installed in 1846 and made by Benjamin Vulliamy. It had a pin-wheel dead-beat escapement, with an eight-day movement. It was expected to last 200 years before needing replacement, and was set going on 25 July 1846.

It was replaced in August 1901 by a clock made by Leonard Hall of Louth. It contained a double three-legged gravity escapement as invented by Edmund Beckett, 1st Baron Grimthorpe, and chimed the Westminster chimes every 15 minutes. The hour hammer weighs 57 pounds (26 kg). The total weight of the clock is about 1 long ton (1.1 short tons) with driving weights of another 1 ton, suspended on steel wire ropes of 450 feet (140 m).

== Organ ==
An organ accompanied the singing of the Te Deum at the consecration of the spire in 1515. This organ had been brought some years before from Flanders. When this organ was worn out in 1531, it is recorded in the parish records:

That the honest men of this towne of Louthe deshirying to have a good payr of organs, to the laude, prayse and honour of God, and the Hole, Holy Co’pany of heffen, made an assemble together for this purpose on a certayne daye; at which type Mr. Richard Taylor, preste and bachelor of laws, then abydyng w’tin the dyocess of Norwiche being p’sent, herying the good devoute mynds, and vertuouse intent of the said townesmen, wherin he was borne and brought up, offred for to cause them have a payr made of a c’nnyng man in Lyn, that should be exampled by a payre of the same making at Ely, who was called Mr. Blyton, which then had a singular Prayse, for the sum of xxii powndes, whereof he pr’mysed to giff thereto xi powndes: upon whiche promesse they accorded, insomuch that the said Mr. Taylor covennantyd and bargaynyd the organ to be made and brought to this towne, and set upon the north syde in the hihhe quere, on St Barnabe Eve, in the yere of oure Lorde, M.V. xxxj., &c., &c.

A new organ by Gray & Davison costing £800 (equivalent to £78,200 in 2025) was opened on 17 December 1857 by Henry Smart. This organ was altered by Forster and Andrews in 1868/9. After a rebuild in 1911 by Norman and Beard, it now has 37 stops and three manuals and pedals.

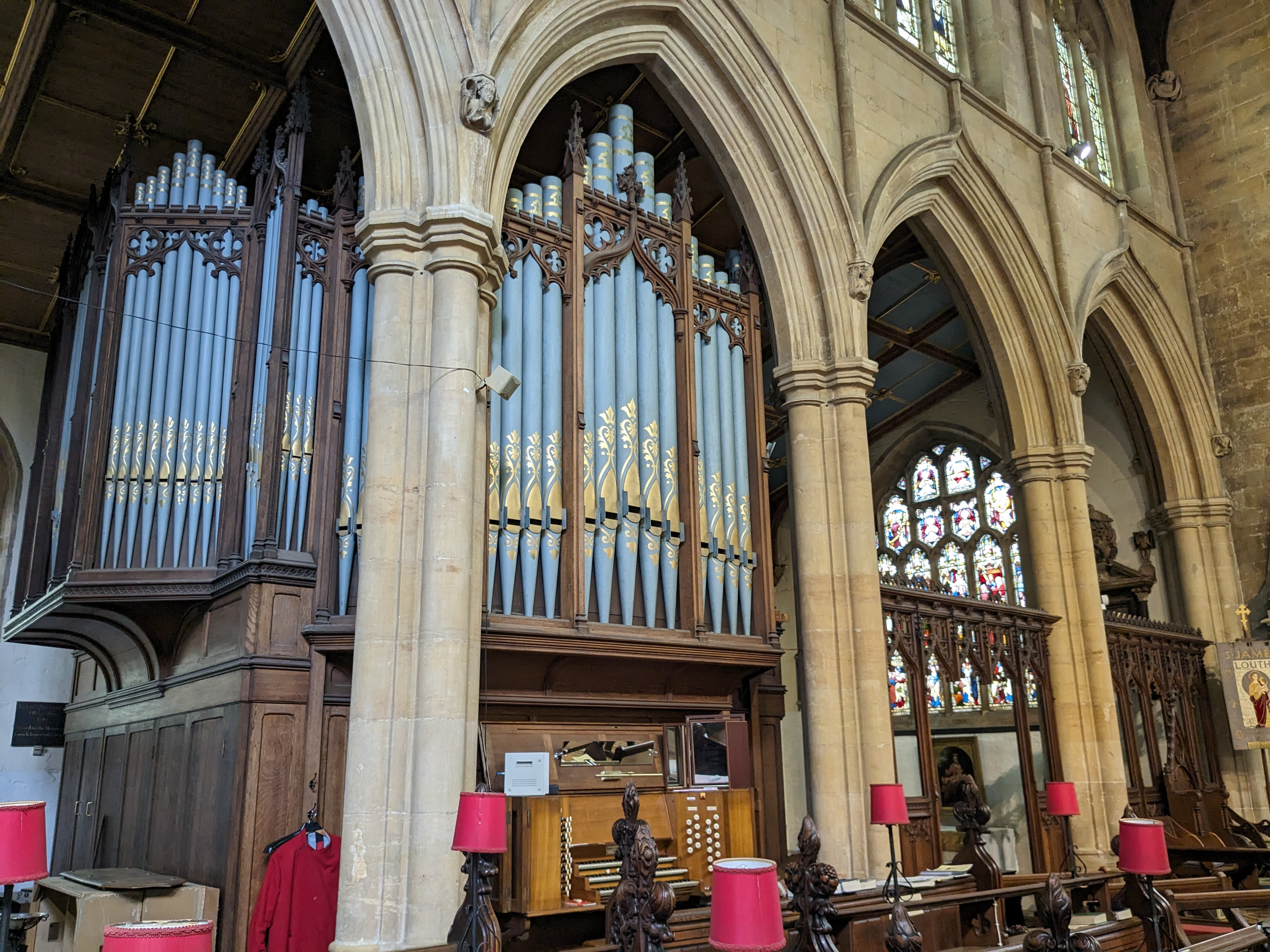
Pipe organ in St James Church

=== Organists ===
- Joseph Hill 1768 – 1819 (formerly a pupil at Beverley Minster; about 30 years of age when he was appointed to Louth, presumably his first and only appointment. See also obit.)
- John Hoyland 1819–1827 (previously organist of St James' Church, Sheffield)
- William Hoyland 1829 – 1857 (son of John Hoyland)
- George Dixon 1859 – 1865 (formerly organist at St Swithun's Church, East Retford, afterwards organist of St Wulfram's Church, Grantham)
- George Henry Porter 1866 – 1897
- Owen Menai Price 1897 - 1946
- Harold Dexter 1946 – 1949 (later organist of Southwark Cathedral)
- Dennis Townhill 1949 – 1956
- William Pierce 1956 – 1960 (returned to Australia)
- Michael Nicholas 1960 – 1964
- Michael John Smith 1965 – 1966 (later organist of Llandaff Cathedral)
- Peter Burness 1966 – 1996
- Frederic Goodwin 1996 – 2009
- Keith Morgan 2009 – 2011
- Lisa Taylor 2011–2015
- Allan Smith 2014–2024 (Master of the Choristers)
- Phil Hotham 2016–2023 (Organist)

=== Assistant organists ===
- Albert Sharman ca.1905
- E. Charles Hopkins 1956 - ????
- Craig Pillans 1968 - 1984
- Anthony Jaule
- Roger Harrison 1999 – 2011

== Visiting and tourism ==
St James is nominated a "Cascade Church" within the Lincolnshire Church Tourism Network, an ecumenical scheme which promotes visits to and understanding of Lincolnshire's many churches. Like other Cascade churches it is stewarded on weekdays and there are guides available until 16:00. The western end of the church now has a tea shop, book shop and toilets, as well as information leading to other churches in the East Lindsey area.

== Gallery ==
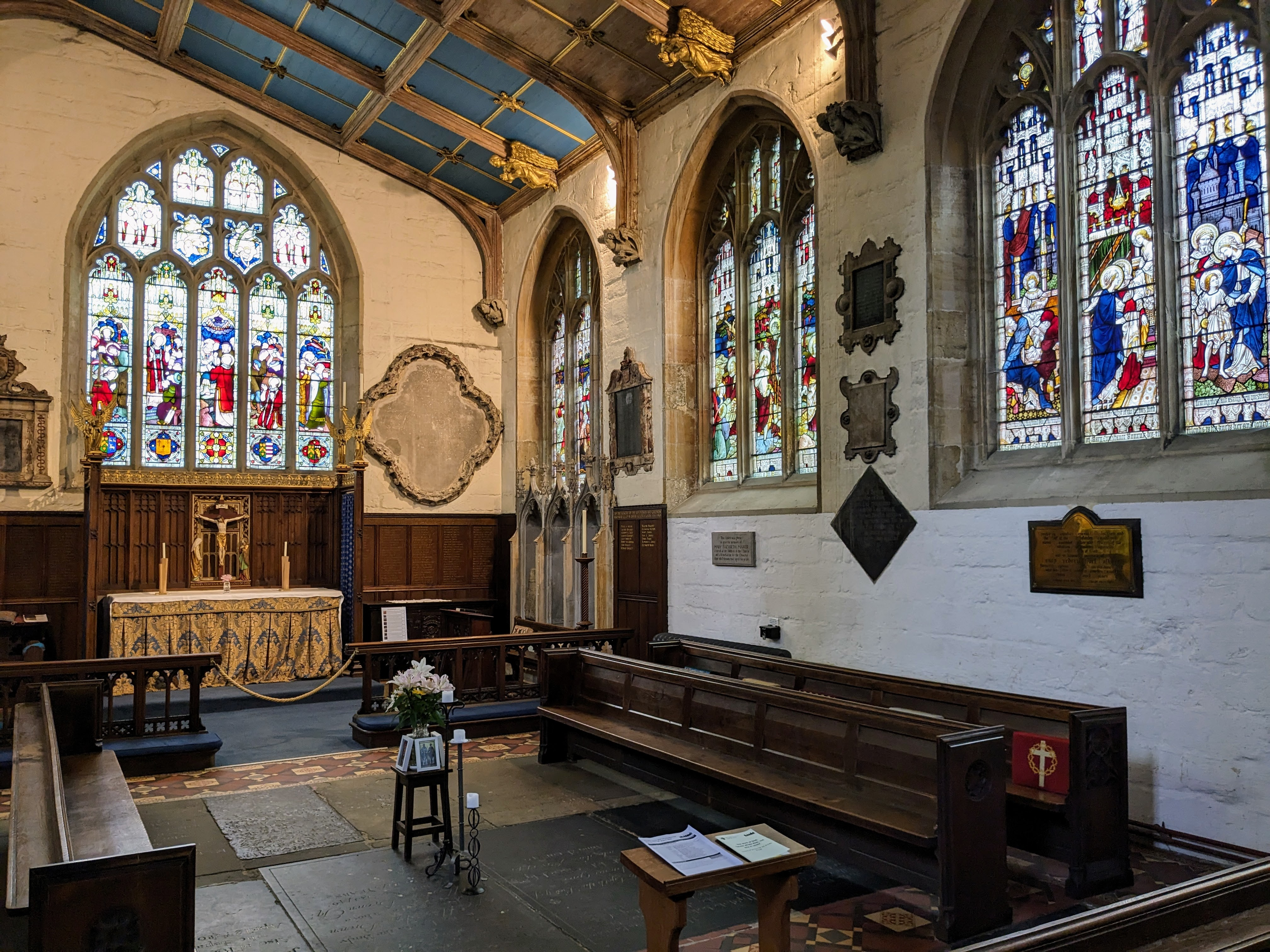
Southern side chapel

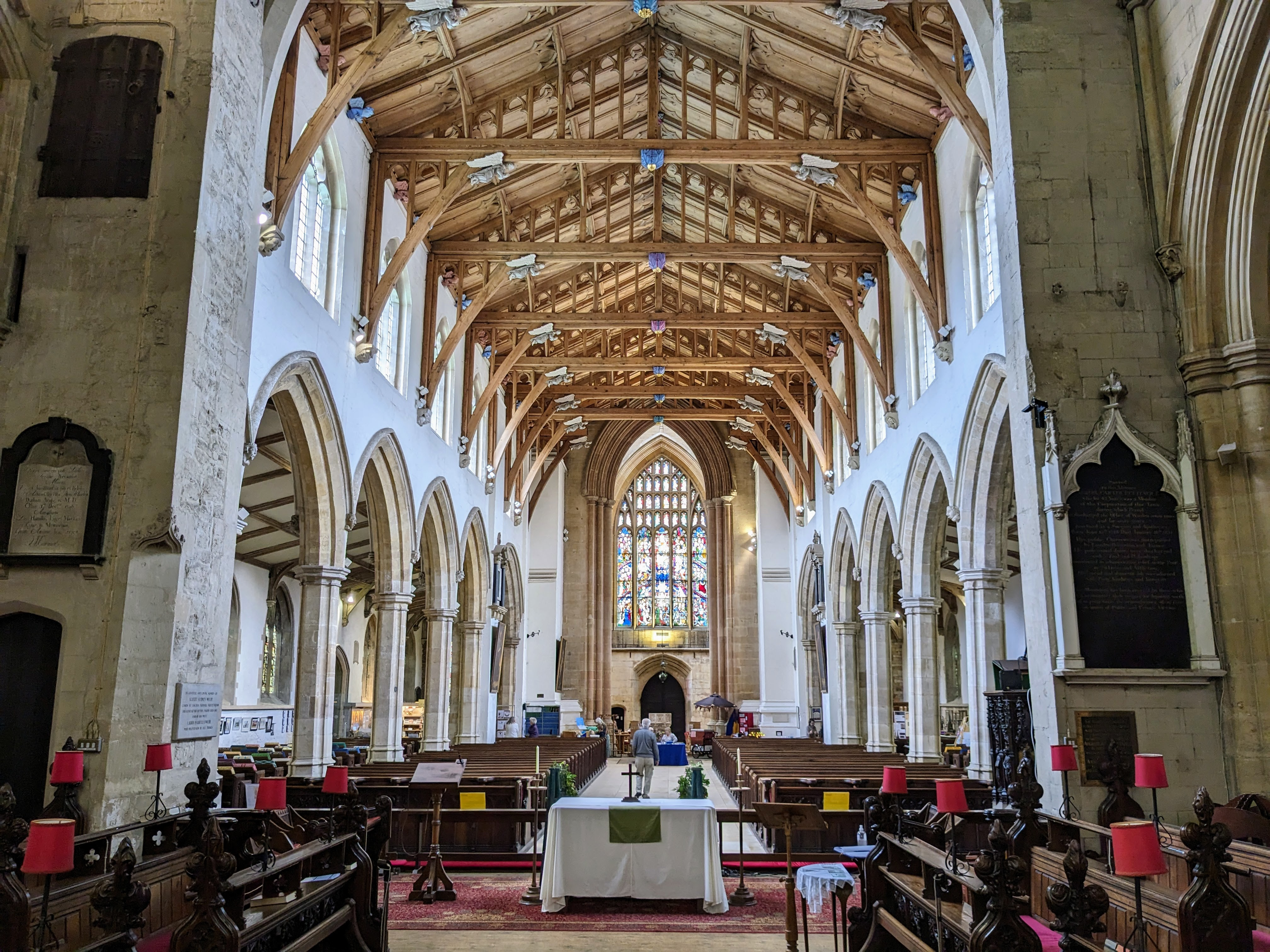
View towards the west end of the church.

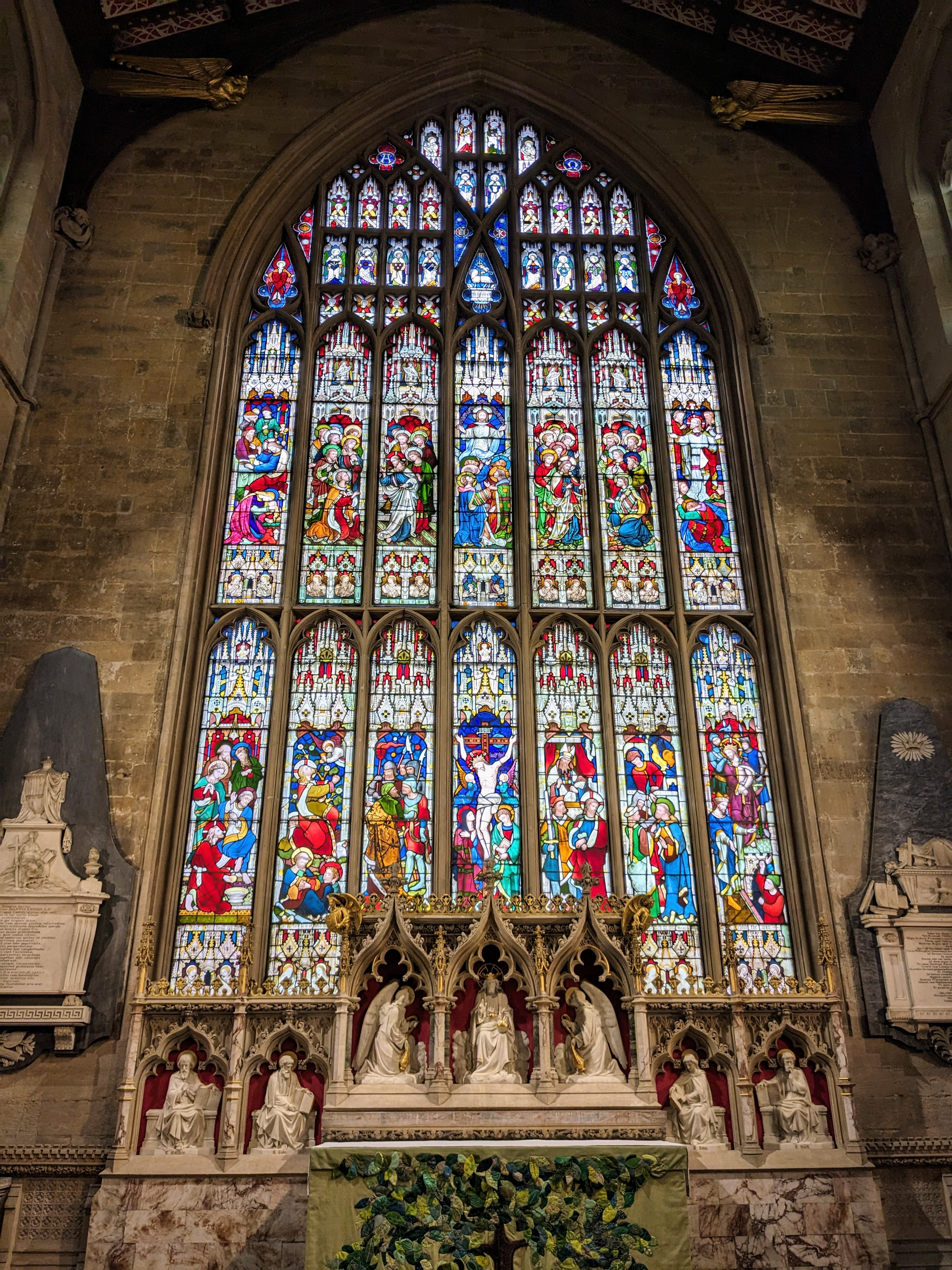
East window.

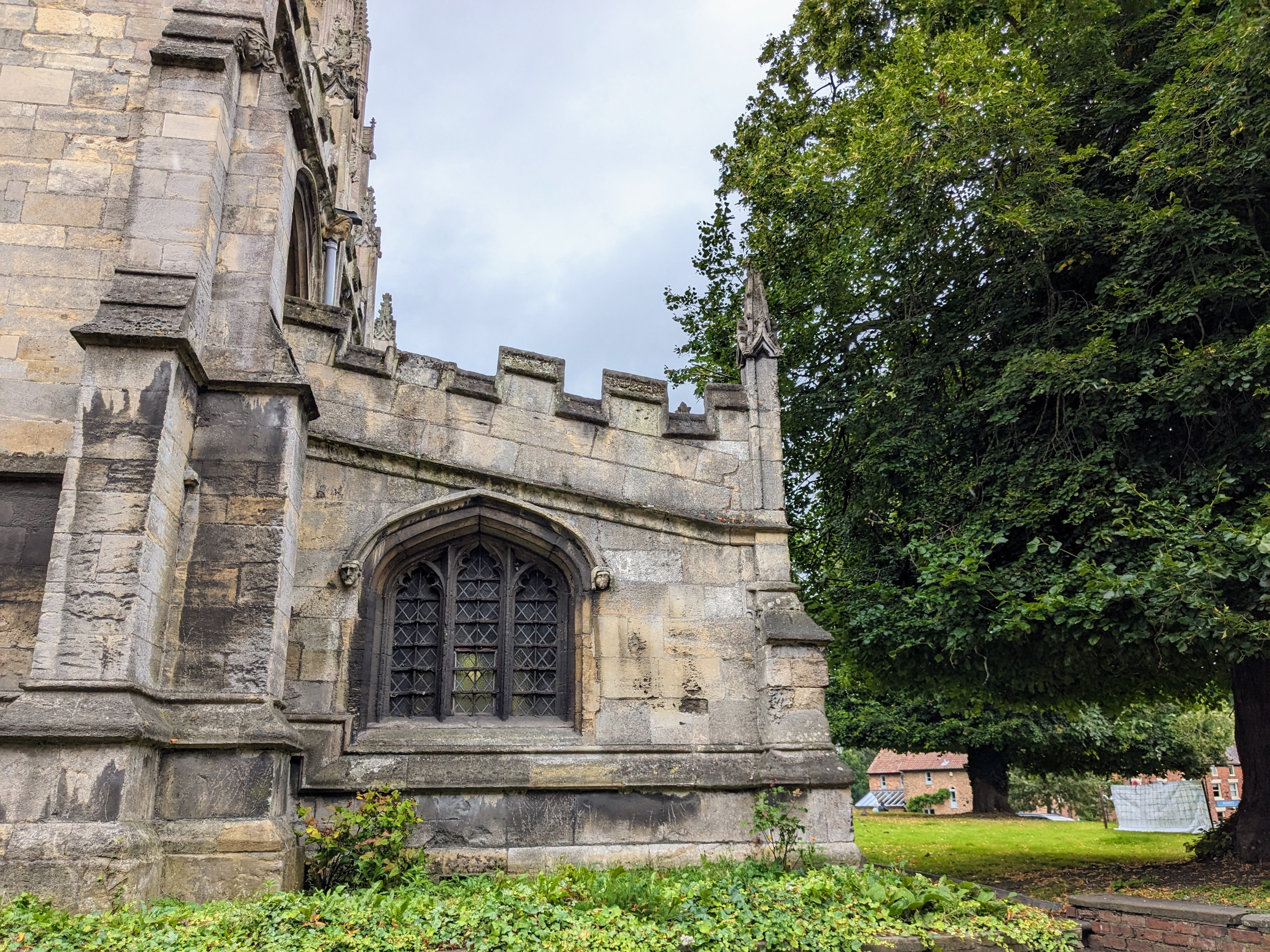
South aisle exterior.

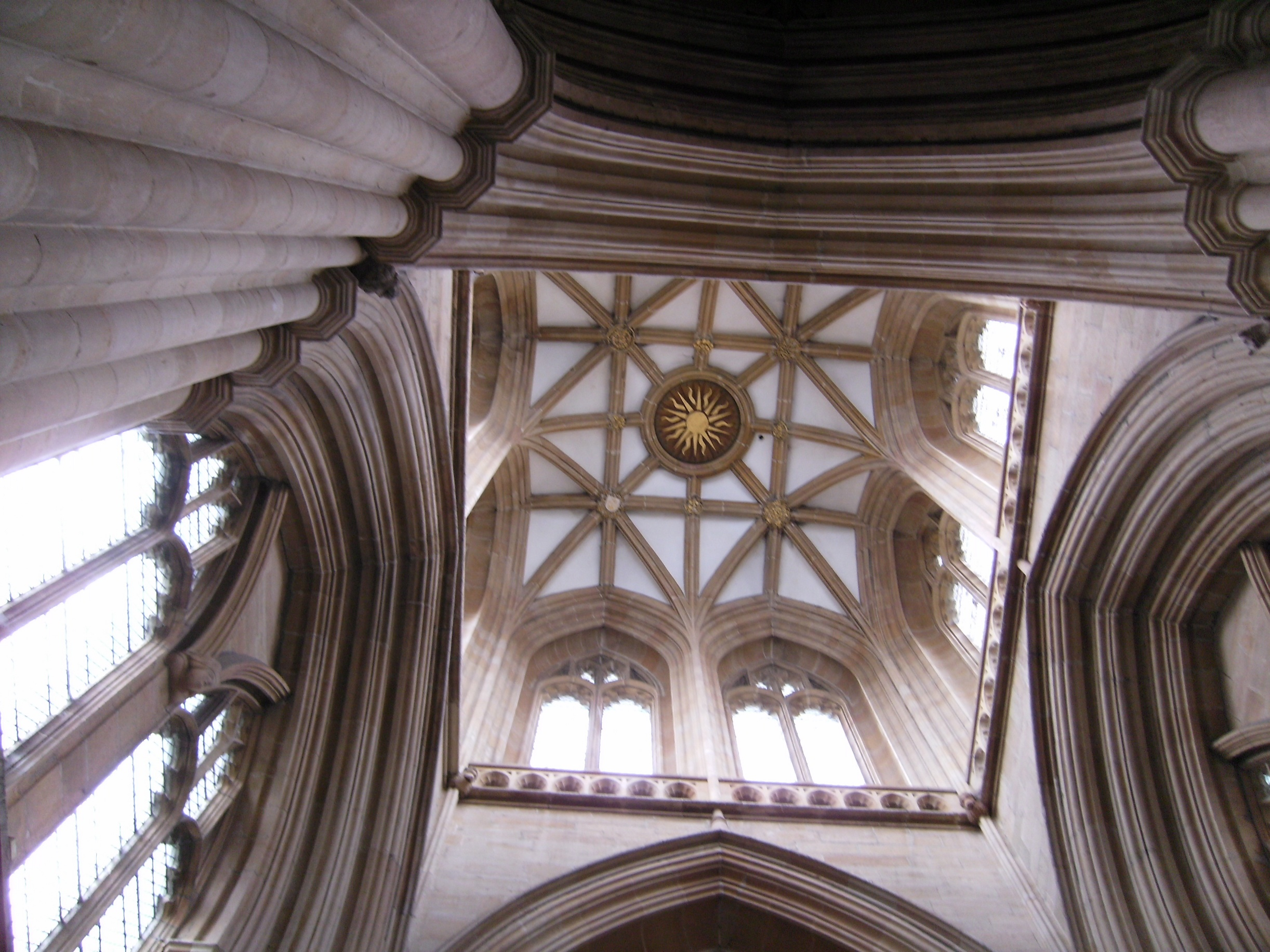
Interior of the western tower or belfry.

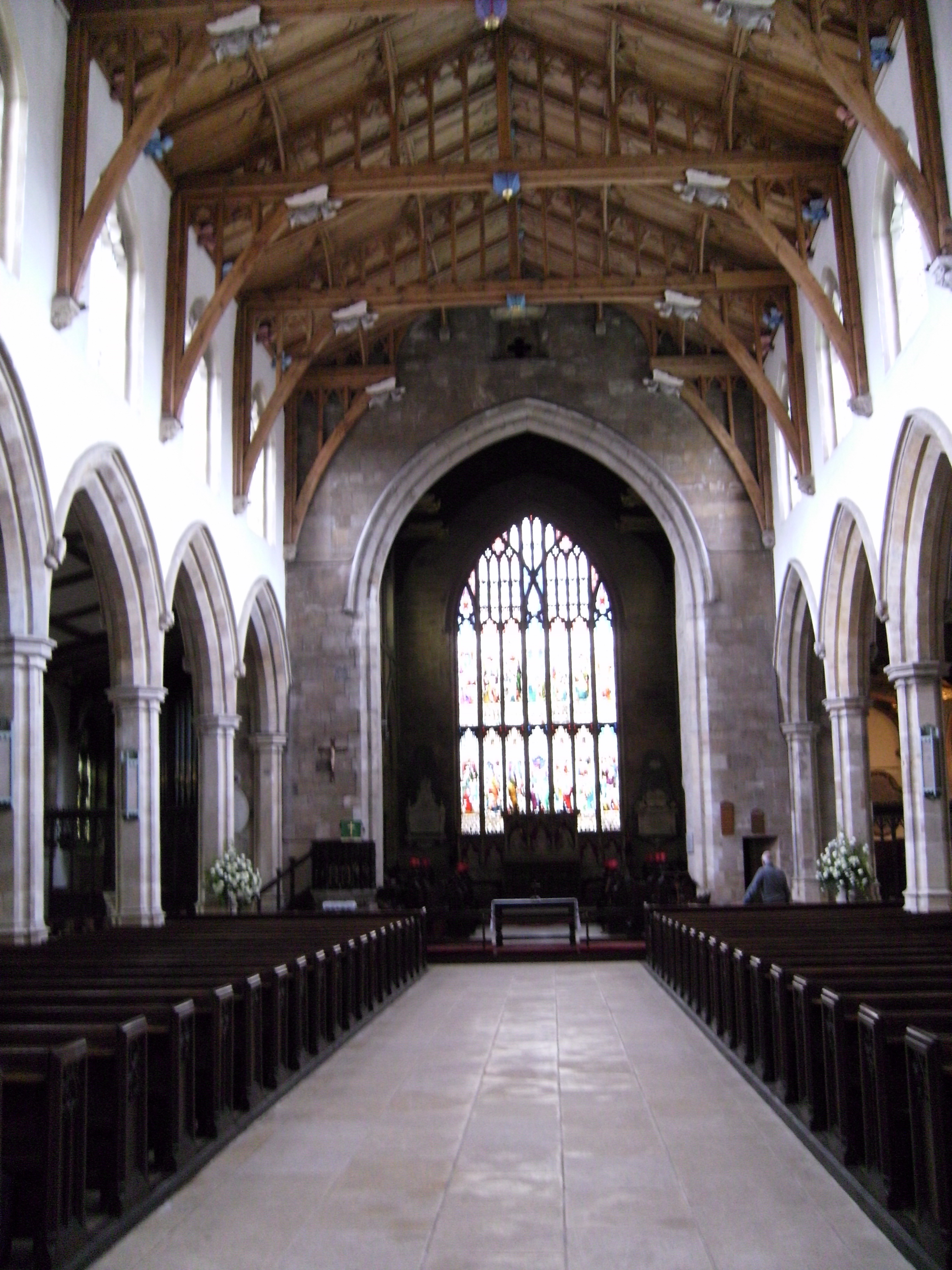
Nave and chancel, viewed from the western end of the church.

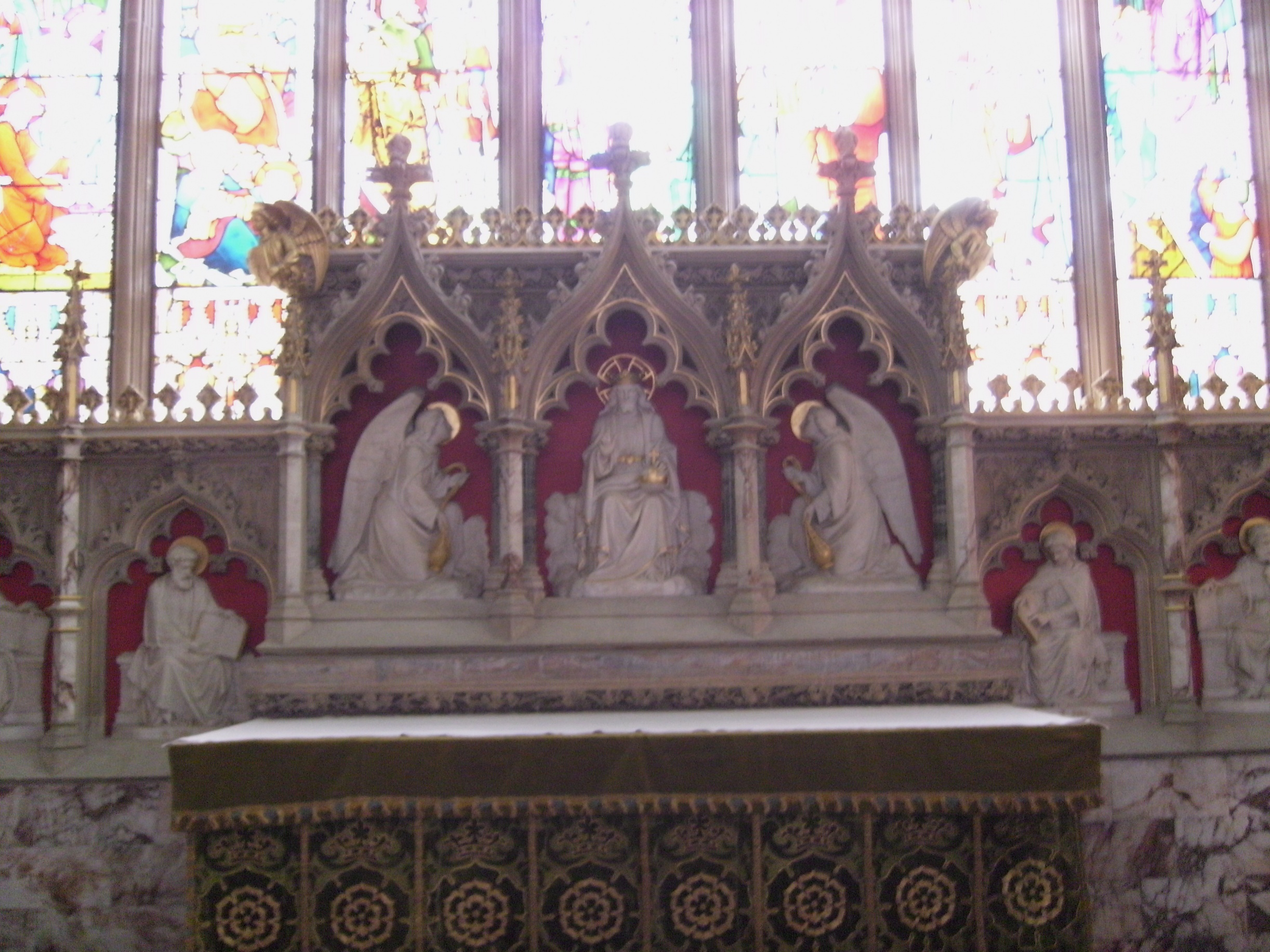
High altar of the church.

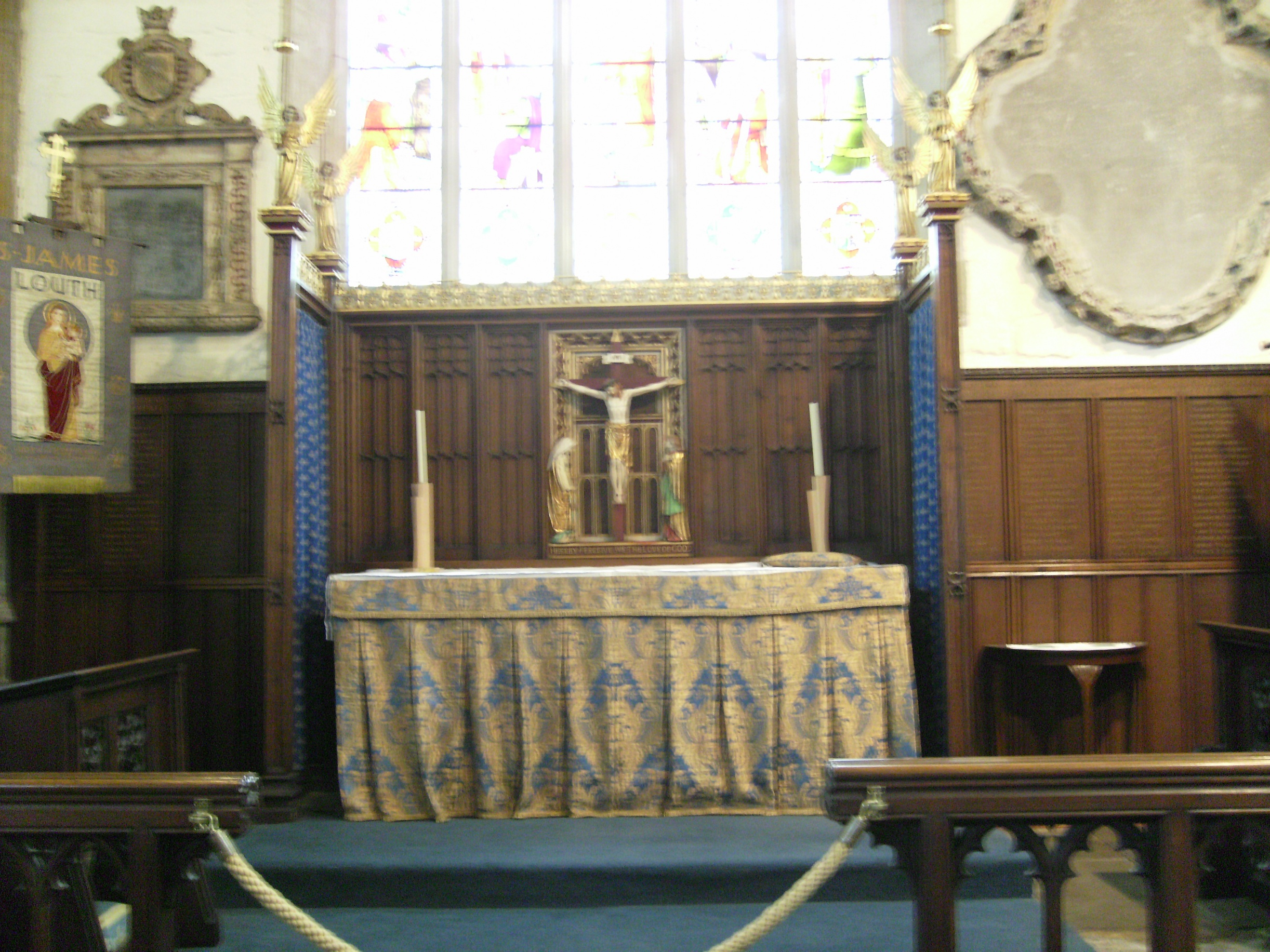
Altar of St Stephen's Chapel.

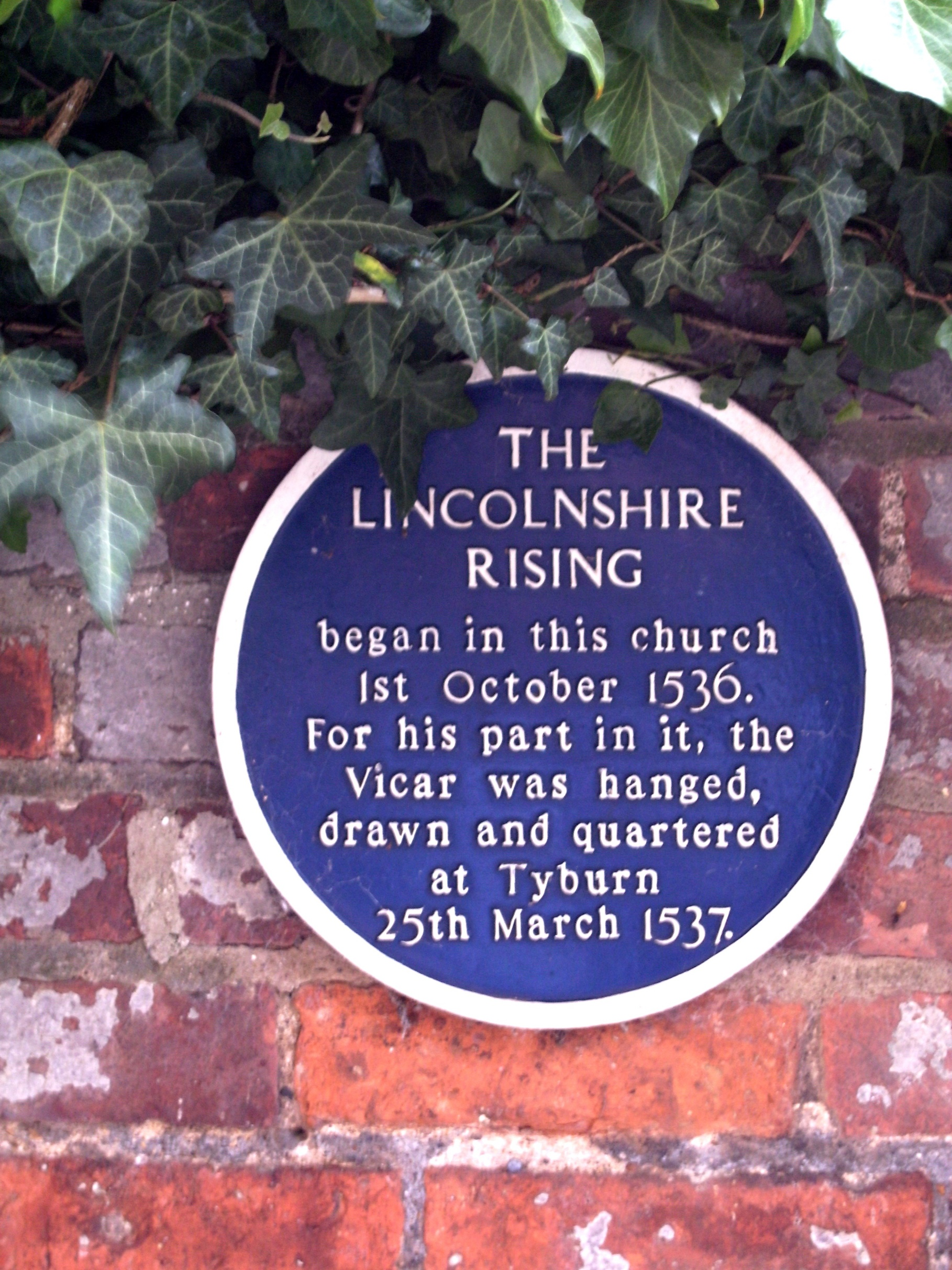
Plaque commemorating Lincolnshire Rising of 1536, opposite south entrance to church.

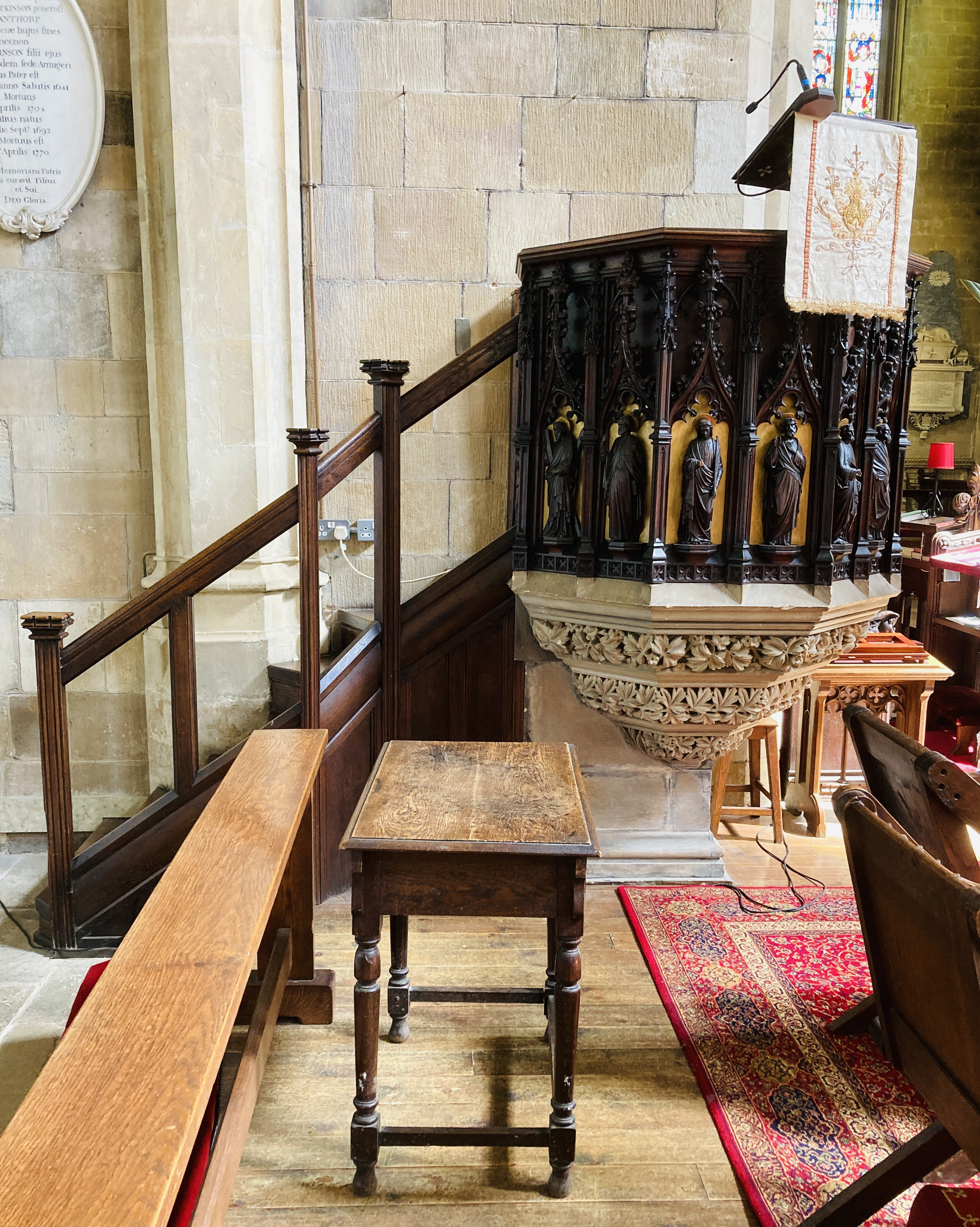
Pulpit carved by Thomas Wilkinson Wallis
