= Alwig =

8th-century Bishop of Lindsey

- Bishop of Lindsey
- Appointed: 733
- Term ended: 750
- Predecessor: Cyneberht
- Successor: Ealdwulf

Orders
- Consecration: 733

Personal details
- Died: 750
- Denomination: Christian

Alwig (or Alwigh) was a medieval Bishop of Lindsey.

Alwig was consecrated in 733. He died in 750.

== Citations ==
Christian titles
Preceded by Cyneberht	Bishop of Lindsey; 733–750	Succeeded by Ealdwulf
