= Ealdwulf of Lindsey =

8th-century Bishop of Lindsey

Ealdwulf
- Bishop of Lindsey
- In office: 750
- Predecessor: Alwig
- Successor: Ceolwulf

Personal details
- Denomination: Christian

Ealdwulf (Note: Or Aldwulf or Eadulphus) (fl. 750–765) was a medieval Bishop of Lindsey.

== Notes ==
Christian titles
Preceded by Alwig	Bishop of Lindsey; 750–765	Succeeded by Ceolwulf
