= John James Cresswell =

English architect

- Born: 1858; Louth, Lincolnshire, England
- Died: 1944; Grimsby, Lincolnshire, England
- Occupation: Architect

John James Cresswell (1858–1944) was an English architect who practiced in Grimsby, Lincolnshire, England.

A son of Samuel Cresswell, master of Mapletoft Boys' School, he worked as an articled assistant and then leading assistant to James Fowler of Louth, Lincolnshire from 1877 to 1884. He then moved to Marlborough, Wiltshire to become an assistant to Charles Ponting. He passed the RIBA qualifying examination in 1892 and became an ARIBA in June 1893. He had moved back to Louth by 1888 and to Grimsby by 1892, setting up his own practice in the Victoria Chambers. In 1900 his address was 77 Victoria Street, Grimsby, where he remained until at least 1926.

== Architectural work ==
- Extension to the Fisherlads Institute, Grimsby, 1907.
- Louth Museum, 1910. Museum of the Louth Naturalists', Antiquarian and Literary Society.
- St Michael, Little Coates. 1933–4. Cresswell added a baptistry to the church.
