= Burgheard =

9th-century Bishop of Lichfield

- Bishop of Lindsey
- Appointed: between 866 and 869
- Term ended: after 869
- Predecessor: Eadbald
- Successor: Leofwine

Orders
- Consecration: between 866 and 869

Personal details
- Died: after 869
- Denomination: Catholic

Burgheard was a medieval Bishop of Lindsey (or perhaps Bishop of Lichfield).

Burgheard is known from one charter, which he witnessed as bishop in 869. The charter does not identify of where he was bishop, so it is possible that Eadberht, who also signed the charter, may have been bishop of Lindsey and he of Lichfield rather than vice versa.

Burgheard was consecrated between 866 and 869 and died sometime after that.

== Citations ==
Christian titles
Preceded by Eadbald	Bishop of Lindsey c. 869	Succeeded by Leofwine
Preceded by Wulfsige	or Bishop of Lichfield; 867x869 – 869x883	Succeeded by Wulfred
