= Eadwulf of Lindsey =

8th and 9th-century Bishop of Lindsey

Eadwulf
- Bishop of Lindsey
- Appointed: 796
- Term ended: between 836 and 839
- Predecessor: Ceolwulf
- Successor: Beorhtred

Orders
- Consecration: 796

Personal details
- Died: between 836 and 839
- Denomination: Christian

Eadwulf (fl. 796 - between 836 and 839) was a medieval Bishop of Lindsey.

Eadwulf was consecrated in 796. He died between 836 and 839. His profession of obedience to Æthelhard, the Archbishop of Canterbury, is the first surviving profession to Canterbury. It notes that he had been a pupil of Æthelhard, and is undated. The actual document names Eadwulf as Bishop of York, which indicates that at some point the document was altered, probably after the Norman Conquest of England, as part of the Canterbury-York dispute over the primacy of Britain. The rest of the profession appears genuine, however.

In his signing an act of the Councils of Clovesho in 803, Eadwulf gives his name and title as Eadwulf Syddensis civitatis episcopus and the location of the former Roman city (civitatis) of Syddensis, or Sidnacester, has been greatly debated. In 1695, Edmund Gibson placed it at Stow, other proposals have been Caistor, Louth and Horncastle. The location remains unknown. More recently Lincoln has been suggested as a possible site.

Christian titles
| Preceded by Ceolwulf | Bishop of Lindsey; 796–c. 837 | Succeeded by Beorhtred |
