= Eadbald of Lindsey =

9th-century Bishop of Lindsey

Eadbald
- Bishop of Lindsey
- See: Diocese of Lindsey
- In office: c.862/866 – c.866/869
- Predecessor: Beorhtred
- Successor: Burgheard or Eadberht

Personal details
- Died: between 866 and 869
- Denomination: Christian

Eadbald was a medieval Bishop of Lindsey.

Eadbald was consecrated between 862 and 866. He died between 866 and 869. His successor is uncertain, who could be either Burgheard or Eadberht.

== Citations ==
Christian titles
Preceded by Beorhtred	Bishop of Lindsey; 862x866 – 866x869	Succeeded by Burgheard or Eadberht
