= Leofwine (bishop of Lindsey) =

10th-century Bishop of Lindsey

- Bishop of Lindsey
- In office: c. 953
- Predecessor: Burgheard or Eadberht
- Successor: Sigeferth

Orders
- Consecration: c. 953

Personal details
- Died: after 953
- Denomination: Christian

Leofwine was a medieval Bishop of Lindsey.

Leofwine was consecrated about 953 and died sometime after. This was a reconstitution of the see after a break in the succession since the death of Burgheard (or perhaps Eadberht) in the previous century. He combined the see with Dorchester in 956, and afterwards the combined see is usually known as Bishop of Lindsey. It appears to have covered Lindsey and Leicester.

== Citations ==
Christian titles
Preceded by Burgheard or Eadberht	Bishop of Lindsey c. 953	Succeeded by Sigeferth
