= Wilferth =

9th and 10th-century Bishop of Lichfield

- Bishop of Lichfield
- See: Diocese of Lichfield
- In office: c. 895–c. 909
- Predecessor: Wulfred
- Successor: Ælfwine

Personal details
- Died: between 909 and 915
- Denomination: Christian

Wilferth was a medieval Bishop of Lichfield.

Wilferth was consecrated between 889 and 900 and died between 909 and 915.

== Citations ==
Christian titles
Preceded by Wulfred	Bishop of Lichfield c. 895–c. 912	Succeeded by Ælfwine
