= Wulfsige of Lichfield =

9th-century Bishop of Lichfield

Wulfsige
- Bishop of Lichfield
- Appointed: between 857 and 862
- Term ended: between 866 and 869
- Predecessor: Tunberht
- Successor: Eadberht

Orders
- Consecration: between 857 and 862

Personal details
- Died: between 866 and 869

Wulfsige (died c. 867) was a medieval Bishop of Lichfield.

Wulfsige was consecrated between 857 and 862 and died between 866 and 869.

== Citations ==
Christian titles
Preceded by Tunberht	Bishop of Lichfield c. 860–c. 867	Succeeded by Eadberht or Burgheard
