= Eadberht of Lichfield =

9th-century Bishop of Lichfield

Eadberht
- Bishop of Lichfield
- Appointed: between 866 and 869
- Term ended: after 875
- Predecessor: Wulfsige
- Successor: Wulfred

Orders
- Consecration: between 866 and 869

Personal details
- Died: after 875
- Denomination: Catholic

Eadberht was a medieval Bishop of Lichfield (or perhaps Bishop of Lindsey).

Eadberht is known from three charters which he witnessed as bishop, in 869, 875 and 875. However the charters do not identify where he was bishop of, so it is possible that Burgheard, who also signed the 869 charter, was bishop of Lichfield rather than Lindsey, and vice versa.

Eadberht was consecrated between 866 and 869. He died after 875.

== Citations ==
Christian titles
Preceded by Wulfsige	Bishop of Lichfield; 866x869 – 875x883	Succeeded by Wulfred
Preceded by Eadbald	or Bishop of Lindsey c. 867–after 875	Succeeded by Leofwine
