= Beorhtred =

9th-century Bishop of Lindsey

- Bishop of Lindsey
- In office: between 836 and 839
- Predecessor: Eadwulf
- Successor: Eadbald

Orders
- Consecration: between 836 and 839

Personal details
- Died: between 862 and 866, perhaps later
- Denomination: Christian

Beorhtred was a medieval Bishop of Lindsey.

Beorhtred was consecrated between 836 and 839. He died between 862 and 866, perhaps later.

== Citations ==
Christian titles
Preceded by Eadwulf	Bishop of Lindsey c. 837–c. 864	Succeeded by Eadbald
