= Ceolwulf of Lindsey =

8th-century Bishop of Lindsey

Ceolwulf
- Bishop of Lindsey
- A mention of Ceolwulf in the Anglo-Saxon Chronicle
- In office: 767
- Predecessor: Ealdwulf
- Successor: Eadwulf

Orders
- Consecration: 767

Personal details
- Died: 796
- Denomination: Christian

Ceolwulf (or Ceolulfus) was a medieval Bishop of Lindsey.

Ceolwulf was consecrated in 767. He died in 796. Charlemagne, in about 793–796 wrote to both Ceolwulf and Æthelhard, Archbishop of Canterbury asking them to plead with Offa of Mercia about some Englishmen who were currently in exile. Ceolwulf left England in 796 with Eadbald, the Bishop of London, but it is not clear if this was as an exile or on pilgrimage or for some other reason. This was shortly after the collapse of Mercian power following the death of Offa. Ceolwulf seems to have not returned to Lindsey, as a new bishop, Eadwulf begins to appear in the records not long after Ceolwulf's departure.

== Citations ==
Christian titles
Preceded by Ealdwulf	Bishop of Lindsey; 767–796	Succeeded by Eadwulf
