= Wulfred of Lichfield =

9th-century Bishop of Lichfield

Wulfred
- Bishop of Lichfield
- Appointed: between either 869/875 and 883
- Term ended: between 889 and 900
- Predecessor: Eadberht
- Successor: Wilferth

Personal details
- Died: between 889 and 900

Wulfred (died c. 895) was a medieval Bishop of Lichfield.

Wulfred was consecrated either between 869 and 883 or 875 and 883 and died between 889 and 900.

== Citations ==
Christian titles
| Preceded by Eadberht or Burgheard | Bishop of Lichfield c. 875–c. 895 | Succeeded by Wilferth |
