= Cyneberht of Lindsey =

8th-century Bishop of Lindsey

Cyneberht
- Bishop of Lindsey
- Appointed: between 716 and 731
- Term ended: 731
- Predecessor: Edgar
- Successor: Alwig

Orders
- Consecration: between 716 and 731

Personal details
- Died: 731
- Denomination: Christian

Cyneberht (Note: Or Embercus or Kinebertus) was a medieval Bishop of Lindsey.

Cyneberht was consecrated between 716 and 731. He died in 731. His death is recorded in the second continuation of the medieval chronicler Bede's Historia ecclesiastica gentis Anglorum under the year 732. He was also one of the informants for Bede's historical works, mainly for information about his diocese. Bede recorded Cyneberht's information as coming from "the most reverent Bishop Cyneberht".

== Citations ==
Christian titles
| Preceded by Edgar | Bishop of Lindsey c. 724–732 | Succeeded by Alwig |
