= Bishop of Lindsey =

Former Catholic diocesan bishop

The Anglo-Saxon dioceses before 925

The Bishop of Lindsey was a prelate who administered an Anglo-Saxon diocese between the 7th and 11th centuries. The episcopal title took its name after the ancient Kingdom of Lindsey.

== History ==
The diocese of Lindsey (Lindine) was established when the large Diocese of Mercia was divided in the late 7th century into the bishoprics of Lichfield and Leicester (for Mercia itself), Worcester (for the Hwicce), Hereford (for the Magonsæte), and Lindsey (for the Lindisfaras).

The bishop's seat at Sidnacester (Syddensis) has been placed, by various commentators, at Caistor, Louth, Horncastle and, most often, at Stow, all in present-day Lincolnshire, England. The location remains unknown. More recently Lincoln has been suggested as a possible site, such as the inner-city suburb of Wigford.

After an interruption by the Danish Viking invasions and establishment of the Danelaw in the 9th century, the see of Lindsey was resumed in the mid-10th century until it was united with the diocese of Dorchester in the early 11th century.

== List of bishops ==
Bishops of Lindsey
From	Until	Incumbent	Notes
678	c. 679	Eadhæd	Expelled, and became Bishop of Ripon; also known as Eadhedus, Eadheath or Eadhaed
c. 680	? 692	Æthelwine	Possibly died in 692; also known as Ethelwine or Elwin
? 693	c.716/731	Edgar	Possibly became bishop in 693; died sometime 716 and 731; also known as Eadgar
c.716/731	731	Cyneberht	Became bishop sometime between 716 and 731; also known as Embercus or Kinebertus
733	750	Alwig	Also known as Alwigh
750	765	Ealdwulf	Also known as Aldwulf or Eadulphus
c.765/767	796	Ceolwulf	Also known as Ceolulfus
796	c.836/839	Eadwulf	Consecrated in 796; died sometime between 836 and 839
c.836/839	c.862/866 (or later)	Beorhtred	
c.862/866	c.866/869	Eadbald	
c.866/869	after 875	Burgheard or Eadberht	
after 875	before 953	During this period, the episcopal succession was interrupted by the Danish Viking invasions	
before 953	c.971/975	Leofwine	Also became Bishop of Dorchester in 971; died between 971 and 975
before 996	after 1004	Sigeferth	
before 1009	after 1011	(? Ælfstan)	Possibly was bishop
By the early 11th century, the see of Lindsey had been merged with that of Dorchester
