= Skelton =

Skelton may refer to:

== Places ==
=== United Kingdom ===
- Skelton, Cumbria, England
  - Skelton Transmitting Station, a radio transmitter and the tallest structure in the UK
- Skelton, East Riding of Yorkshire, England
- North Yorkshire, England:
  - Skelton, Richmondshire
  - Skelton-on-Ure or Skelton, Harrogate
  - Skelton, York
  - Skelton-in-Cleveland or Skelton
    - Skelton Castle
    - Skelton Beck, a river that flows by Skelton-in-Clevelans
  - North Skelton, a village in Skelton and Brotton
  - Skelton and Brotton, a civil parish in Redcar and Cleveland

=== United States ===
- Skelton, Indiana
- Skelton Township, Warrick County, Indiana
- Skelton Township, Carlton County, Minnesota
- Skelton, West Virginia

=== Antarctica ===
- Skelton Icefalls, Warren Range, Victoria Land
- Skelton Glacier, Victoria Land
- Skelton Inlet, Victoria Land, the terminus of the Skelton Glacier

== People ==
- Skelton (surname), a list of people
- Skelton Knaggs (1911–1955), English actor
- Skelton Yorke, penname of British botanist Margaret Plues (1840–1903)

== Other uses ==
- Lord of Skelton, a title of peerage in Plantagenet England for the Bruce Dynasty at Skelton, York
- Skelton (1818 ship), a British sailing trade ship wrecked in 1828

== See also ==
- Skelton Castle (1800 ship), a British merchant ship
- Shelton (disambiguation), a sixteenth-century alternate spelling
- Skeleton (disambiguation)
- Skilton, a surname derived from Skelton
