= G. L. S. Shackle =

English economist (1903–1992)

- Born: 14 July 1903; Cambridge, England
- Died: 3 March 1992 (aged 88)

Academic work
- School or tradition: Post-Keynesian economics
- Notable ideas: Kaleidics

George Lennox Sharman Shackle (14 July 1903 – 3 March 1992) was an English economist. He made a practical attempt to challenge classical rational choice theory and has been characterised as a "post-Keynesian", though he is influenced as well by Austrian economics. Much of his work is associated with the Dempster–Shafer theory of evidence.

== Life ==
He was born in Cambridge, son of Robert Walker Shackle (1851-1934), a mathematics-teacher father who had coached John Maynard Keynes to an Eton scholarship, and Fanny Sharman (1865-1936). Shackle attended The Perse School; but his parents could not afford to support him through university, so he started work as a bank clerk. Later becoming a teacher, he studied in his own time for a University of London BA degree which he took in 1931. He started work on a PhD under the supervision of Friedrich Hayek at the LSE but switched to an interpretation of Keynes's General Theory of Employment, Interest and Money. He obtained his doctorate in 1937. At LSE he became good friends with German born economist Ludwig Lachmann, who was inspired by Shackle's own work on uncertainty; and developed his own theory of divergent expectations based on Shackle's writing.

Following a number of academic posts, at the outbreak of World War II in 1939, Shackle was appointed to S-Branch, Sir Winston Churchill's inner office of economists. There he served along with Donald MacDougall and Helen Makower under the leadership of Frederick Lindemann.

Following the war, a short stint at the Cabinet Office under James Meade and at the University of Leeds led to appointment as Brunner Professor of Economics at the University of Liverpool, a post he held until his retirement in 1969.

== Overview ==
Shackle was influenced by Keynes and Gunnar Myrdal and challenged the conventional role of probability in economics, contending that it failed adequately to deal with "surprising" events. The grounds of his thinking can be seen in Keynes's remark:

By "uncertain" knowledge … I do not mean merely to distinguish what is known for certain from what is only probable. The game of roulette is not subject, in this sense, to uncertainty … The sense in which I am using the term is that in which the prospect of a European war is uncertain, or the price of copper and the rate of interest twenty years hence, or the obsolescence of a new invention … About these matters there is no scientific basis on which to form any calculable probability whatever. We simply do not know!

— John Maynard Keynes, The General Theory of Employment, Interest and Money

Though technical in nature, Shackle's work took economics into novel territory such as the importance of imagination in economic decisions to assess the plausibility of alternative outcomes. Though Shackle's work has had a limited impact on mainstream thought within economics, it continues (perhaps increasingly) to attract interest. Among Shackle's contributions to decision making theory, his potential surprise theory of economic decisions was the most formidable. Abandoning the probability theory foundations of most of modern economics, Shackle proceeded to focus on plausibility or a possibility analysis of economic decisions. To Shackle, economic agents did not make decisions based on probability distributions and consequently derive rational expectations from the "hard data" as New Classical economists such as Leonard Savage support, to Shackle, the crucial element in economic decision making was imagination, which consequently factors into decision making. Shackle's considerations of imperfect knowledge's role in economics foresaw many of the advances in psychological economics, particularly from Herbert Simon's bounded rationality theory. When realizing that economic decision makers lack the knowledge necessary for probabilistic analysis, the ability to consequently make rational expectations off of said data is almost impossible. To make matters even more complicated for the New-Classical economists, Shackle proceeded with his analysis, already attacking one of the core foundations of modern Mainstream economics, perfect knowledge.

To Shackle, economic decision making was not derived from probability and frequency, it was based on the imagination's role in comprehending the possibility of economic decisions. If probability analysis held true for most economic decisions, most of modern economies would not exist. In this idealized state in which rational expectations could be generated, entrepreneurs simply would not exist. Entrepreneurship is probabilistically irrational, it makes little sense to embark upon an economic decision in which its fate is determined by millions of other contingent human beings and their subjective needs and preferences. The probabilistic analysis of such a situation would be strongly biased in favor of refraining from engaging in entrepreneurship; it simply makes little sense to engage in such a process for the economic statistician when the odds of such a situation being a success are immensely minute. It would then follow that in a world in which individuals interpreted probability before making economic decisions, individuals would refrain from entrepreneurship, for such a risky endeavor to be successful is such a situation in which the outcome depends on subjective preferences of unknown individuals. Entrepreneurs, then, are truly irrational in a probabilistic evaluation of economic decisions.

Understanding such a peculiar situation to the statistician, Shackle proceeded to develop his potential surprise theory of economic decision making. Rather than weighing entire frequencies of outcomes for a certain situation, economic decision makers would weigh only a few outcomes and possibilities before making a real economic action; Shackle proposed only two possible outcomes for economic decision makers to weigh, rather than the frequency of an entire probability distribution. Shackle's potential surprise theory was fundamentally based on the role of imagination in economics, bridging the great asymmetry of knowledge of entrepreneurs to make actions which consequently determine the future:

"At the heart of Shackle’s theory of choice is the idea that, when people consider the possible consequences of taking a decision, they give their attention only to those outcomes that they (a) imagine and (b) deem, to some degree, to be possible. This set of outcomes is not guaranteed to include what actually happens, which may be an event they had not even imagined and which comes as a complete surprise to them"

Shackle's theory of choice is a theory that is incredibly odd to most mainstream economists dealing with choice theory, primarily due to the fact potential surprise theory is not a theory of probability and knowledge, it's a theory of imagination and possibility. Potential surprise theory is based on the entrepreneur, or economic decision maker, who weighs two different possible choices based on tolerable levels of potential surprise. The economic decision maker first distinguishes between the possible and the impossible outcomes and proceeds to eliminate this from their considerations. An outcome that happens to be subjectively terrible and implausible by the economic decision maker can be represented by a variable R , and an outcome that is subjectively amazing but also implausible by the economic actor will be assigned the variable U. Anything better than U and worse than R are eliminated from the view of the economic decision maker and the focus of the two values to be chosen by the economic decision maker is to be in-between these two maximum points. The focus two points for the economic actor that are in between these two values are then weighed by their level of potential surprise, whether or not they are subjectively tolerable to the economic actor. A recurring theme throughout Shackle's work is the subjective use of the imagination to guide economic decisions. Rather than weighing every possible function, or at least a majority of the functions in a probability distribution, a Shackleian economic actor proceeds to make their economic decisions based on subjective dual decisions and simply weighs the two against one another before proceeding with a course of action. The economic actor is in a way keeping his options open, a possibility that does not occur for the Savage expected utility hypothesis economic actor who takes the "Look before you jump expression" to its logical extremities; a notion untenable for the real economic world. At the centre of Shackle's kaleidic vision was the ability for economic actors to keep their options open and due to imperfect knowledge and the nature of imagination, proceed with the dual analysis of possibilities rather than entire probability distributions. Shackle had, for a period of time had captured the attention of economists, however this slowly waned as economics moved away from Shackle's theory and towards the foundations of the rational expectations hypothesis, consequently leading to the rational expectations revolution, even capturing the attention of Kenneth Arrow, a renowned Mainstream economist:

"The reason for the current lack of interest is probably not any denial that Shackle’s position is fundamentally correct; it is the absence of the analytic tools needed to make the exceptional approach capable of generating operationally meaningful conclusions."

Despite the latter iterations of Shackle's economic theory of decision making, there still has been little change to the economic consensus on probability theory, although Shackle's potential surprise theory bears a remarkable similarity with scenario planning of the Royal Dutch Shell, a peculiarity even Shackle noticed.

On further contributions outside of decision making theory, he also claimed the importance of Gunnar Myrdal's analysis by which saving and investment are allowed to adjust ex ante to each other. However, the reference to ex ante and ex post analysis has become so usual in modern macroeconomics that the position of Keynes to not include it in his work, is currently considered as an oddity, if not a mistake. As Shackle put it:

Myrdalian ex ante language would have saved the General Theory from describing the flow of investment and the flow of saving as identically, tautologically equal, and within the same discourse, treating their equality as a condition which may, or not, be fulfilled.

Shackle has also made important contributions to the history of economic thought, especially with regard to twentieth century economic schools of thought.

== Expansion on Keynes' economics ==
While Shackle thought that Keynes' work provided the best basis on which to construct a new type of economics he thought that Keynes had not fully understood the importance of the revolution that he had undertaken when he had written his key works. Shackle said that Keynes' work must be understood as having taken three steps until it finally arrived at a new revolutionary method of economic analysis. The first of these three steps was to be found in Keynes' Treatise on Money. "Before the Treatise", Shackle wrote, "the interest rate was determined by tastes and objective circumstances, by the persuadibility of income-earners to transfer consumption from the present into the future, and the desire of business men to transfer the means of free enterprise from the future to the present, thus altering the productive possibilities and enlarging the prospective income of the society including themselves". Shackle wrote that already in his Treatise on Money Keynes was attacking this conception of the interest rate.

In the Treatise we are shown the bond-market as it exists in real life: a speculative market where a price, with an identity and a momentary stability, can only exist if there are two camps of dealers holding opposite views of the impending movement of bond prices.

Shackle maintained that Keynes had not yet in the Treatise understood "the meaning of the great undermining which had thus happened to the theory of value". But on Shackle's reading Keynes abandoned this great undermining of the "theory of value —by which he meant the marginalistic theory, therefore marginainalsitic economics; any economics based on market equilibrium—in his General Theory instead falling back on a "curious methodology... where what is displayed to the reader is a range of 'equilibria' of the most precarious and ephemeral kind". Shackle writes that Keynes only really arrived at the true meaning of the revolution he had undertaken in Chapter 12 of the General Theory and then, more forcefully, in his 1937 article in the Quarterly Journal of Economics entitled The Theory of Employment. In these writing Keynes formulated a theory of uncertainty about the future that exploded the entire edifice of traditional economics which rested, implicitly, on the notion of timeless equilibrium conceptions which implied full access to knowledge on the part of all actors.

In outlining this Shackle sought to marry what he considered Keynes' best insights in the Treatise on Money with his later notion of liquidity preference in the General Theory. In doing so Shackle formed a coherent, speculative theory of interest rates in which interest rates are set in line with financial speculators' expectations in the face of an uncertain future. Shackle wrote:

The bond price, and, as an arithmetical and rigid consequence, the interest rate is an inherently restless variable.

This complemented Keynes' own idea in the General Theory that investment is ultimately set in line with the animal spirits of those investment and was thus not subject to rational calculation, as that term was understood by economists of the main stream. These two points render Shackle's expansion of Keynes' economics inherently indeterminate. For Keynes and Shackle a market economy need not arrive at any particular destination. It is to be seen as an entity in continuous flux that will only generate sufficient investment to ensure full employment by an unlikely fluke.

== Equilibrium versus time ==
The essence of Shackle's radical reevaluation of economic theory was primarily epistemic. He thought that neoclassical economics and other forms of economics that use equilibrium methods ignored the dimension of time. Neoclassical economics relies on the idea that agents will act rationally; but this rationality is effectively synonymous with saying that agents know the future. Shackle pointed out that in order for agents to act "rationally"—in the sense that neoclassical economists understood that word—they would have to logically know what actions all other agents were going to undertake. This, Shackle claimed, was effectively the same as assuming that they knew the future. Shackle maintained that the way that neoclassical economics had smuggled in this strong assumption was in its use of simultaneous equations.

When they tried to justify this method neoclassical economists, beginning with Léon Walras and Francis Ysidro Edgeworth invoked the principle of tâtonnement or "groping". They assumed that agents would continuously test out different bids and prices until the series of bids and prices that produced equilibrium was reached. This implied that the system of simultaneous equations was being used as a sort of shorthand for a result that was actually reached dynamically through a series of trials and errors. But Shackle claimed that this type of reasoning based on an analogy between a static system of simultaneous equations and a dynamic process of tâtonnement was extremely misleading.

When we examine this suggestion, we see that it is no more than a formal acknowledgement of a problem, the problem of how (by what institutional arrangement, by what organization of affairs) the equilibrium prices are to be discovered. Repeated trial and error, while the market stands in suspense awaiting the outcome, is not a practical resort. The number of distinct trials, even if confined to discrete steps of price and quantity, would be so immense that the necessary 'market day' would extend beyond human life-times... [The] theoretical ideal applies to mutually isolated days or moments, each to be treated as perfectly self-contained and looking to no yesterday and no tomorrow. But the real market is dealing with goods inherited from yesterday, and in means of production whose products will not be ready till tomorrow. Meanwhile the non-economic circumstances are changing and rendering each successive equilibrium obsolete.

Shackle claimed that the entire market equilibrium construct could not deal with time and could thus not deal with the actual material which the economist must study, which was inherently historical by nature. What is more Shackle was extremely dismissive of attempts to relax the strong assumptions of market equilibrium theory to render it more realistic. He thought that the foundations were too at odds with the nature of the material being dealt with to salvage it by relaxing some of the stronger assumptions as, for example, Neo-Keynesian and New Keynesian economists try to do. He wrote:

There is little point in demanding minor concessions and relaxations of the abstract, timeless general equilibrium. The light it can throw on human affairs is thrown by its most austere and formal version. We are not concerned to ask: How could it possibly work? The useful question is: What does its logical structure imply?.

Shackle went on to write that what the market equilibrium conception showed was a world of perfect knowledge frozen in time. It thereby negated itself as being of any use in a world where knowledge of the future is impossible and time moves in one direction. In such a world the action of human beings must be in part based on reason and in part on imagination—specifically, imagination with respect to what various individuals imagine the future might be or even should be. Shackle wrote that neoclassical economics rested on a teleological or pre-determined future and thus left no space for human choice which was inherently tied up with a human being's capacity to freely imagine what might be in store in the future. Shackle wrote:

Whatever form it takes, the possession of the imaginative gift transforms the problem of accounting for human conduct. For now it is not a question of how given needs are satisfied. Deliberative conduct, choice, the prime economic act, depend for their possibility, when they go beyond pure instinctive animal response to stimulus, upon the conceptual power of the human mind. Choice is necessarily amongst thoughts, amongst things imagined.

For Shackle this was the correct path for a serious economics that purported to deal with the real world should take. It should move away from abstractions that could not account for time or proper, free choice and instead should try to make sense of a world where both imagination and reason played a role in determining economic outcomes. Shackle called this type of reasoning kaleidics.

== Others commenting on Shackle ==
In 'The Black Swan', Nassim Nicholas Taleb writes about Shackle (emphasis added):

Hayek is one of the rare celebrated members of his "profession" (along with J. M. Keynes and G.L.S. Shackle) to focus on true uncertainty, on the limitations of knowledge, on the unread books in Eco's library.

[...]

Tragically, before the proliferation of empirically blind idiot savants, interesting work had been begun by true thinkers, the likes of J. M. Keynes, Friedrich Hayek, and the great Benoit Mandelbrot, all of whom were displaced because they moved economics away from the precision of second-rate physics. Very sad. 'One great underestimated thinker is G.L.S. Shackle, now almost completely obscure, who introduced the notion of "unknowledge"', that is, the unread books in Umberto Eco's library. It is unusual to see Shackle's work mentioned at all, and I had to buy his books from secondhand dealers in London.

== Bibliography ==
- Frowen, S.F., ed. (2004). Economists in Discussion : The Correspondence Between G.L.S. Shackle and Stephen F. Frowen, 1951–1992. Palgrave Macmillan. ISBN 0-333-77208-3.
- Shackle, G.L.S. (1938) Expectations, Investment and Income
- — (1949). Expectations in Economics. Gibson Press. ISBN 0-88355-816-5.
- Economics for Pleasure. Cambridge University Press. 1959. ISBN 0-521-06282-9.
- Decision Order & Time in Human Affairs. Cambridge University Press. 1961.
- — (1967). The Years of High Theory: Invention and Tradition in Economic Thought 1926–1939. Cambridge University Press. ISBN 0-521-06279-9 – via Internet Archive.
- — (1970). Expectation, Enterprise and Profit: The Theory of the Firm. Routledge. ISBN 0-415-31378-3.
- — (1972). Epistemics & Economics: A Critique of Economic Doctrines. Transaction Publishers. ISBN 1-56000-558-0 – via Internet Archive.
- — (1979). Imagination and the Nature of Choice. Edinburgh University Press. ISBN 0-85224-357-X.
- — (1983). "The Bounds of Unknowledge". In Wiseman, J. (ed.). Beyond positive economics. New York: St. Martin's Press. doi:10.1007/978-1-349-16992-4_3.
