= Skelton Township =

Skelton Township may refer to the following townships in the United States:

- Skelton Township, Warrick County, Indiana
- Skelton Township, Carlton County, Minnesota

== See also ==
- Skelton (disambiguation)
