= Skeleton Crew =

Skeleton Crew may refer to:

== Music ==
- Skeleton Crew (band), an American experimental rock and jazz group
- Skeleton Crew, an American record label co-founded by Frank Iero
- Skeleton Crew, a 2015 album by Madisen Ward and the Mama Bear
- The Skeleton Crew, the house band on the Netflix revival of Mystery Science Theater 3000
- Skeleton Krew (also spelled "Skeleton Crew"), a British band formed by Paul King (Mungo Jerry)

== Literature ==
- Skeleton Crew (short story collection), a 1985 collection of short fiction by Stephen King
- The Skeleton Crew (book), a 2014 true-crime book

== Television ==
- Bones: Skeleton Crew, a web series
- Star Wars: Skeleton Crew, a Star Wars TV series, released in 2024
- "Skeleton Crew", an episode of American TV series JAG

== Other uses ==
- Skeleton Crew (comics), a fictional villanous organization, a group of Marvel Comics supervillains formed by the Red Skull
- Skeleton Crew (film), a 2009 Finnish horror film
- Skeleton Crew (play), a 2016 play by Dominique Morisseau
- Skeleton Krew, a 1995 videogame from Core Design

== See also ==
- Skeleton (disambiguation)
- Crew (disambiguation)
