= Frederick Apthorp Paley =

English classical scholar (1815–1888)

Frederick Apthorp Paley (14 January 1815 – 8 December 1888), was an English classical scholar.

== Life ==
Born at Easingwold in Yorkshire, to Rev. Edmund Paley and Sarah (née Apthorp), he was the grandson of William Paley, and brother of architect E.G. Paley, and was educated at Shrewsbury School and St John's College, Cambridge (BA 1838). His conversion to Roman Catholicism forced him to leave Cambridge in 1846, but he returned in 1860 and resumed his work as "coach," until in 1874 he was appointed by Mgr Thomas Capel as professor of classical literature at the newly founded Roman Catholic University at Kensington. This institution was closed in 1877 for lack of funds, and Paley removed to Boscombe, where he lived until his death.

== Works ==
His most important editions are:

- Aeschylus, with Latin notes (1844-1847), the work by which he first attracted attention
- Aeschylus (4th ed., 1879)
- Euripides (2nd ed., 1872)
- Propertius, Carmina. The Elegies of Propertius, with English notes (2nd ed., 1872), London : Bell & Dandy
- Hesiod (2nd ed., 1883)
- Homer's Iliad (2nd ed., 1884)
- Sophocles' Philoctetes, Electra, Trachiniae, Ajax (1880)--all with English commentary and forming part of the Bibliotheca classica
- select private orations of Demosthenes (3rd ed., 1896–1898)
- Theocritus (2nd ed., 1869), with brief Latin notes, one of the best of his minor works

He possessed considerable knowledge of architecture, and published a Manual of Gothic Architecture (1846) and Manual of Gothic Mouldings (1845).
