= St. George Jackson Mivart =

English biologist

St. George Jackson Mivart FRS
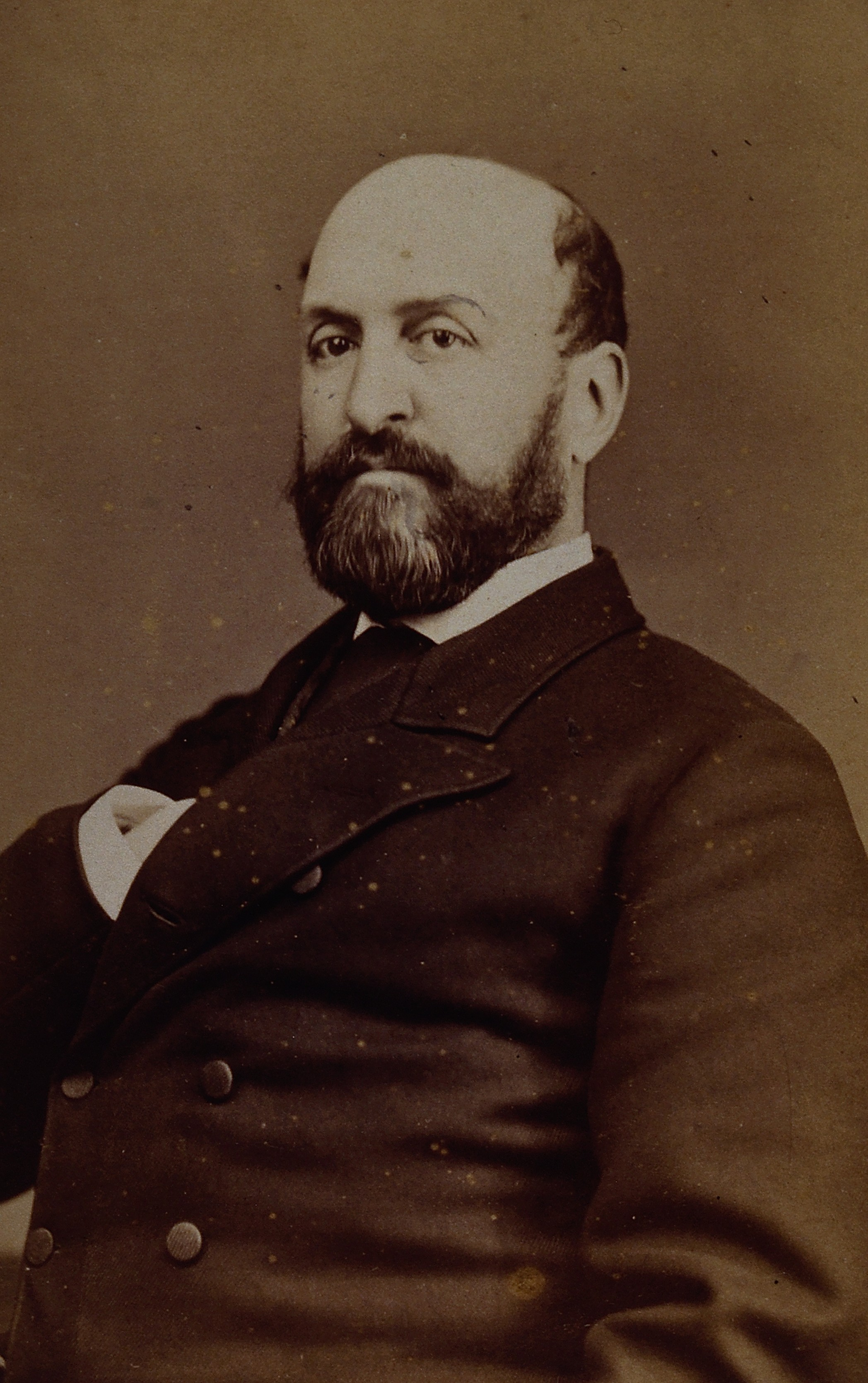
- Mivart, by Barraud & Jerrard
- Born: 30 November 1827; London, England
- Died: 1 April 1900 (aged 72); London, England

St. George Jackson Mivart (/ˈmaɪvərt/; 30 November 1827 – 1 April 1900) was an English biologist. He is famous for starting as an ardent believer in natural selection and later becoming one of its fiercest critics. Mivart attempted to reconcile the theory of evolution as propounded by Charles Darwin with the beliefs of the Catholic Church but was condemned by both Darwin and the Church (although his condemnation by the Church was not because of his scientific ideas, but due to his theological ones). His belief in a soul created by God and insistence that evolutionism was not incompatible with the existence of such a God brought him into conflict with other evolutionists, while his theological theories on hell led him to clash with the Church.

== Early life ==
Mivart was born in London. His parents were Evangelicals, and his father was the wealthy owner of Mivart's Hotel (now Claridge's). His education started at the Clapham Grammar School and continued at Harrow School and King's College London. Following his conversion to Catholicism, he was instructed at St. Mary's, Oscott (1844–1846), and was confirmed there on 11 May 1845. His conversion automatically excluded him from the University of Oxford, then open only to members of the Anglican faith. His mother followed him into the Catholic Church in 1846.

== Appointments ==
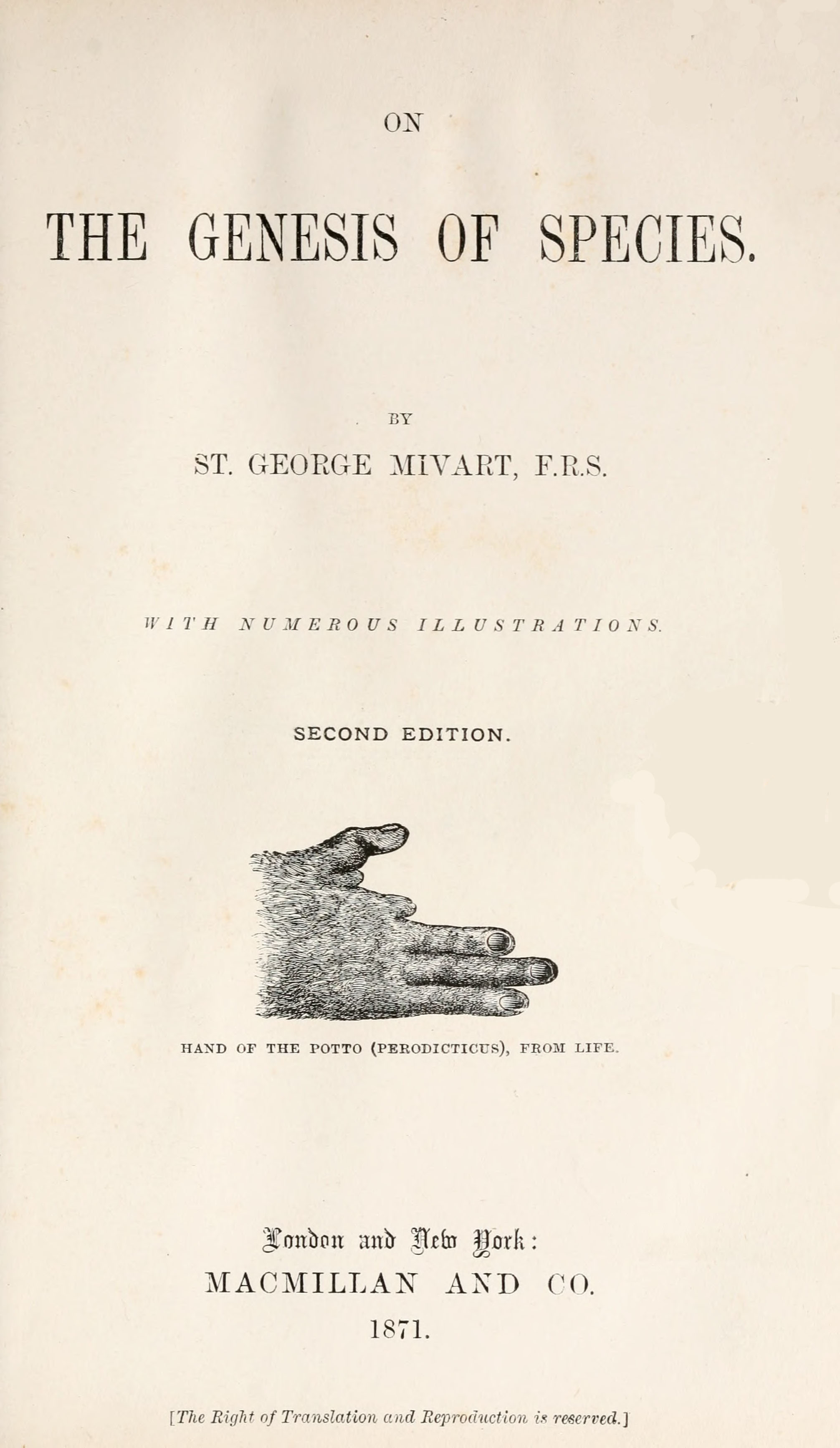
Title page of On the Genesis of Species

In 1851 he was called to the bar at Lincoln's Inn, but he devoted himself to medical and biological studies. In 1862 he was appointed to the chair in zoology at St. Mary's Hospital medical school. In 1869 he became a fellow of the Zoological Society of London, and in 1874 he was appointed by Thomas John Capel as Professor of Biology at the short-lived Catholic University College, Kensington, a post he held until 1877.

He was vice-president of the Zoological Society twice (1869 and 1882); Fellow of the Linnean Society from 1862, secretary from 1874 to 1880, and vice-president in 1892. In 1867 he was elected a Fellow of the Royal Society for his work "On the Appendicular skeleton of the Primates". This work was communicated to the society by Thomas Henry Huxley. Mivart was a member of the Metaphysical Society from 1874. He received the degrees of Doctor of Philosophy from Pope Pius IX in 1876, and of Doctor of Medicine from the University of Louvain in 1884.

== Controversy ==
=== Mivart and Huxley ===
Mivart met Thomas Henry Huxley in 1859, and was initially a close follower and a believer in natural selection. "Even as a professor he continued to attending Huxley's lectures ... they became close friends, dining together and arranging family visits." However, Huxley was always strongly anti-Catholic, and no doubt this attitude led to Mivart becoming disenchanted with him. Once disenchanted, he lost little time in reversing on the subject of natural selection. In short, he now believed that a higher teleology was compatible with evolution.

As to "natural selection", I accepted it completely and in fact my doubts & difficulties were first excited by attending Prof. Huxley's lectures at the School of Mines.

=== Mivart's alternative evolutionism ===
Even before Mivart's publication of On the Genesis of Species in 1871, he had published his new ideas in various periodicals. Huxley, Ray Lankester, and William Henry Flower had come out against his ideas, although O'Leary (2007) reports that "their initial reaction to Genesis of Species was tolerant and impersonal".

Though admitting evolution in general, Mivart denied its applicability to the human intellect (a view also taken by Alfred Russell Wallace). His views as to the relationship between human nature and intellect and animal nature in general were given in his books Nature and Thought and Origin of Human Reason.

Mivart was someone Charles Darwin took seriously; Darwin prepared a point-by-point refutation which appeared in the sixth edition of Origin of Species. One of Mivart's criticisms to which Darwin responded was a perceived failure of natural selection to explain the incipient stages of useful structures. Taking the eye as an example, Darwin was able to show many stages of light sensitivity and eye development in the animal kingdom as proof of the utility of less-than-perfect sight (argument by intermediate stages). Another was the supposed inability of natural selection to explain cases of parallel evolution, to which Huxley responded that the effect of natural selection in places with the same environment would tend to be similar.

Mivart's hostile review of the Descent of Man in the Quarterly Review aroused fury from his former intimates, including Darwin himself, who described it as "grossly unfair". Mivart had quoted Darwin by shortening sentences and omitting words, causing Darwin to write: "Though he means to be honourable, he is so bigoted that he cannot act fairly." Relationships between the two men were near breaking point. In response, Darwin arranged for the reprinting of a pamphlet by Chauncey Wright, previously issued in the US, which severely criticised Genesis of Species. Wright had, under Darwin's guidance, clarified what was, and was not, "Darwinism".

The quarrel reached a climax when Mivart lost his usual composure over what should have been a minor incident: in 1873, George Darwin (Charles' son) published a short article in The Contemporary Review suggesting that divorce should be made easier in cases of cruelty, abuse, or mental disorder. Mivart reacted with horror, using phrases like "hideous sexual criminality" and "unrestrained licentiousness". Huxley wrote a counter-attack, and both Huxley and Darwin broke off connections with Mivart. Huxley blackballed Mivart's attempt to join the Athenaeum Club.

=== Mivart's banned theological articles ===
In 1892 and 1893 Mivart published three articles on "Happiness in Hell" in the journal The Nineteenth Century. Mivart proposed that the punishments of hell were not eternal, and that hell is compatible with some kind of happiness.

These articles were placed on the Index Expurgatorius. This was the first official action of the Catholic Church against Mivart but it "had nothing to do either with evolution or science". Later articles in January 1900 ("The Continuity of Catholicism" and "Scripture and Roman Catholicism" in The Nineteenth Century, and "Some Recent Catholic Apologists" in The Fortnightly Review) led to his being placed under interdict by Cardinal Herbert Vaughan. These last articles were written, by Mivart's own admission, in a provocative tone so that the authorities would have to act. In them, reversing his previous stance, he challenged the authority of the Church, concluding that the Bible and Catholic doctrine could not be reconciled with science.

"Without attempting to pass judgment on Mivart’s final stance, we can say that his attitude was not solely or principally determined by scientific motives and, more concretely, that evolution did not occupy a determining role in it."

The report of the consultor of the Holy Office dealing with Mivart's case does not mention evolution.

== Death ==
Mivart died of diabetes in London on 1 April 1900. His late heterodox opinions were a bar to his burial in consecrated ground. However, Sir William Broadbent gave medical testimony that these could be explained by the gravity and nature of the diabetes from which he had suffered.

After his death, a long final struggle took place between his friends and the Church authorities. On 6 April 1900, his remains were deposited in catacomb Z beneath the Dissenters' Chapel, in the unconsecrated ground of the dissenters' section of the General Cemetery of All Souls, Kensal Green, in a public vault reserved for "temporary deposits" (most of which were destined for repatriation to mainland Europe or the Americas). His remains were finally transferred to St. Mary's Catholic Cemetery, Kensal Green, on 16 January 1904, for burial there on 18 January 1904.

== Legacy ==
Mivart's name is commemorated in the scientific name of a species of lizard, Emoia mivarti.

== Bibliography ==
=== Chief works ===
- On the Genesis of Species, Macmillan & Co., 1871.
- An Examination of Mr. Herbert Spencer's Psychology (Dublin 1874–80).
- Lessons in Elementary Anatomy, 1873.
- The Common Frog, Macmillan and Co., 1874 [1st Pub. in Nature Series, 1873].
- Man and Apes: An Exposition of Structural Resemblances and Differences Bearing upon Questions of Affinity and Origin. London: Robert Hardwicke, 1873.
- "One Point of Controversy with the Agnostics," in Manning, ed. Essays on Religion and Literature, Third Series, Longmans, Green & Co., 1874.
- Lessons from Nature, 1876.
- Contemporary Evolution, Henry S. King & Co., 1876.
- Address to the Biological Section of the British Association, 1879.
- The Cat: An Introduction to the Study of Backboned Animals, Especially Mammals, John Murray, 1881.
- Nature and Thought: An Introduction to a Natural Philosophy, Kegan Paul, Trench & Co., 1882.
- A Philosophical Catechism, 1884.
- On Truth: A Systematic Inquiry, Kegan Paul, Trench & Co., 1889.
- The Origin of Human Reason, Being an Examination of Recent Hypotheses Concerning it, Kegan Paul, Trench & Co., 1889.
- Dogs, Jackals, Wolves and Foxes: Monograph of the Canidæ, Taylor & Francis, for R.H. Porter and Dulau & Co., 1890.
- Introduction Générale à l'Etude de la Nature: Cours Professé à l'Université de Louvain, Louvain and Paris, 1891.
- Birds: The Elements of Ornithology, Taylor & Francis, 1892.
- Essays and Criticisms, Vol. 2, 1892.
- Types of Animal Life, 1893.
- Introduction to the Elements of Science. Boston: Little, Brown and Company, 1894.
- The Helpful Science, Harper & Brothers, 1895.
- Castle and Manor, 1900.
- A Monograph of the Lories, or Brush-tongued Parrots, H. R. Porter, 1896.
- The Groundwork of Science: A Study of Epistemology, John Murray, 1898.

=== Miscellany ===
- Under the Ban: A Correspondence between Dr. St. George Mivart and Herbert Cardinal Vaughan. New York: Tucker Publishing Co., 1900.
- Chisholm, Hugh, ed. (1911). "Ape" . Encyclopædia Britannica. Vol. 2 (11th ed.). Cambridge University Press. p. 160.
- Mivart, St. George Jackson; Gadow, Hans Friedrich (1911). "Rattlesnake" . In Chisholm, Hugh (ed.). Encyclopædia Britannica. Vol. 22 (11th ed.). Cambridge University Press. pp. 919–920.

=== Selected articles ===
- "Difficulties of the Theory of Natural Selection," Part II, Part III, The Month, Vol. XI, 1869.
- "On the Use of the Term 'Homology'," The Annals and Magazine of Natural History, No. 32, 1870.
- "Evolution and its Consequences – A Reply to Professor Huxley," The Contemporary Review, Vol. XIX, 1872.
- "Contemporary Evolution," Part II, Part III, The Contemporary Review, Vols. XXII/XXIII, 1873/1874.
- "Instinct and Reason," The Contemporary Review, Vol. XXV, 1875.
- "Likenesses: or Philosophical Anatomy," The Contemporary Review, Vol. XXVI, 1875.
- "Natural History of the Kangaroo," Popular Science Monthly, Vol. VIII, 1876.
- "What are Bats?," Popular Science Monthly, Vol. IX, 1876.
- "Liberty of Conscience," The Dublin Review, Vol. XXVII, 1876.
- "Emotion," The American Catholic Quarterly Review, Vol. III, 1878.
- "The Meaning of Life," The Nineteenth Century, Vol. V, 1879.
- "The Government of Life," The Nineteenth Century, Vol. V, 1879.
- "On the Study of Natural History," The Contemporary Review, Vol. XXXV, 1879.
- "What are Living Beings?," The Contemporary Review, Vol. XXXV, 1879.
- "Animals and Plants," The Contemporary Review, Vol. XXXVI, 1879.
- "The Forms and Colours of Living Creatures," The Contemporary Review, Vol. XXXVI, 1879.
- "The Relation of Animals and Plants to Time," The Contemporary Review, Vol. XXXVII, 1880.
- "The Geography of Living Creatures," The Contemporary Review, Vol. XXXVII, 1880.
- "The Relation of Living Beings to One Another," The Contemporary Review, Vol. XXXVII, 1880.
- "Notes on Spain," Part II, Part III, The American Catholic Quarterly Review, Vol. V, 1880.
- "The Soul and Evolution," The American Catholic Quarterly Review, Vol. VI, 1881.
- "A Limit to Evolution," The American Catholic Quarterly Review, Vol. VIII, 1883.
- "On Catholic Politics," The Dublin Review, Vol. XCIII, 1883.
- "The Life and Times of Frederic II," Part II, Part III, The American Catholic Quarterly Review, Vol. IX, 1884.
- "Phases of Faith and Unfaith," The Catholic World, Vol. XXXIX, 1884.
- "Ecclesiastical Survivals and Revivals," The Catholic World, Vol. XL, 1885.
- "Organic Nature's Riddle," Part II, The Eclectic Magazine, Vol. XLI, 1885.
- "Modern Catholics and Scientific Freedom," The Nineteenth Century, Vol. XVIII, 1885.
- "A Tour in Catholic Teutonia," Part II, The Catholic World, Vol. XLII, 1886.
- "What Are Animals and Plants?," The American Catholic Quarterly Review, Vol. XI, 1886.
- "Notes on Colonial Zoology," The Contemporary Review, Vol. LI, 1887.
- "The Catholic Church and Biblical Criticism," The Nineteenth Century, Vol. XXII, 1887.
- "Catholicity and Reason," The Nineteenth Century, Vol. XXII, 1887.
- "The Future of Christianity," The Forum, Vol. III, 1887.
- "Laughter," The Forum, Vol. III, 1887.
- "On the Possibly Dual Origin of the Mammalia," Proceedings of the Royal Society of London, Vol. XLIII, 1888.
- "Why Tastes Differ," The American Catholic Quarterly Review, Vol. XIII, 1888.
- "Impressions of Life in Vienna," The American Catholic Quarterly Review, Vol. XIII, 1888.
- "Sins of Belief and Sins of Unbelief," The Nineteenth Century, Vol. XXIV, 1888.
- "Darwin's Brilliant Fallacy," The Forum, Vol. VII, 1889.
- "Where Darwinism Fails," The Forum, Vol. VII, 1889.
- "Professing Themselves to be Wise, They Become Fools," The American Catholic Quarterly Review, Vol. XVI, 1891.
- "The Foundations of Science," Natural Science, Vol. I, No. 7, 1892.
- "Happiness in Hell," The Nineteenth Century, Vol. XXXII, 1892.
- "Catholicity in England Fifty Years Ago—A Retrospect," Part II, Part III, The American Catholic Quarterly Review, Vol. XVII/XVIII, 1892/1893.
- "Evolution in Professor Huxley," The Nineteenth Century, Vol. XXXIV, 1893.
- "Christianity and Paganism," The Nineteenth Century, Vol. XXXIV, 1893.
- "The Index and my Articles on Hell," The Nineteenth Century, Vol. XXXIV, 1893.
- "L'Ancien Régime," Part II, The American Catholic Quarterly Review, Vol. XVII/XVIII, 1893/1894.
- "The Newest Darwinism," The American Catholic Quarterly Review, Vol. XIX, No. 76, 1894.
- "The Evolution of Evolution," The American Catholic Quarterly Review, Vol. XX, 1895.
- "Balfour's Philosophy. Part I.: Some Consequences of Belief," The American Catholic Quarterly Review, Vol. XXI, 1896.
- "Balfour's Philosophy. Part II.: Some Reasons for Belief," The American Catholic Quarterly Review, Vol. XXI, 1896.
- "What Makes a Species?," The American Catholic Quarterly Review, Vol. XXIII, 1898.
- "Living Nature," The American Catholic Quarterly Review, Vol. XXIII, 1898.
- "The Continuity of Catholicism," The Nineteenth Century, Vol. XLVII, 1900.
- "Scripture and Roman Catholicism," The Nineteenth Century, Vol. XLVII, 1900.

== Sources ==
- Herbermann, Charles, ed. (1913). "St. George Jackson Mivart" . Catholic Encyclopedia. New York: Robert Appleton Company.
