= Roger Garrison =

American economist

- Born: 7 February 1944; Joplin, Missouri, United States
- Died: 13 February 2026 (aged 82); Auburn, Alabama, United States

Academic background
- Education: University of Virginia; University of Missouri-Kansas City
- Influences: Ludwig von Mises • Friedrich Hayek • Ludwig Lachmann • Leland B. Yeager

Academic work
- Discipline: Macroeconomics
- School or tradition: Austrian School
- Institutions: Auburn University
- Notable ideas: Capital-based macroeconomics

Roger Wayne Garrison (7 February 1944 - 13 February 2026) was an American economist of the Austrian School, best known for his work on capital-based macroeconomics. He was a longtime professor at Auburn University, and an adjunct scholar at the Mises Institute.

== Education ==
Born in Joplin, Missouri, Garrison received a BS in electrical engineering from the University of Missouri at Rolla in 1967, following which he joined the United States Air Force. While in the Air Force, he worked as a systems engineer, specializing in electronic countermeasures at Rome Laboratory at Griffiss Air Force Base; he rose to the rank of captain. Following the Vietnam War, he left the military, Garrison earned an MA in economics from the University of Missouri–Kansas City in 1974; he then went to work for the Federal Reserve Bank of Kansas City. In 1981, he received a PhD in economics from the University of Virginia, where he studied under Leland B. Yeager.

== Career ==
In 1978, Garrison began teaching at Auburn University as an instructor. In winter and spring of 1981, he served as a post-doctoral fellow and adjunct professor at New York University. Upon his graduation from the University of Virginia in 1981, he became an assistant professor at Auburn; he was later made an associate professor in 1988, and a full professor in 1996.

He was the inaugural Hayek Fellow at the London School of Economics in 2003, and served as president of the Society for the Development of Austrian Economics in 2004.

== Capital-Based Macroeconomics ==
When entering graduate school, Garrison's primary field of research was macroeconomics and monetary theory. Garrison's key contribution to the field was his graphical representation of the Austrian Business Cycle Theory. His first paper on the topic, "Austrian Macroeconomics: A Diagrammatical Exposition" was initially drafted as a term paper in his master's program and presented at a meeting in Chicago in 1973. He rewrote it and presented the new version in September 1976 at an Institute for Humane Studies symposium at Windsor Castle. This version would later be published as a monograph in 1978. He would later expand upon these ideas in later journal articles, including "Phillips Curves and Hayekian Triangles: Two Perspectives on Monetary Dynamics" (1988) coauthored with Don Bellante, Professor of Economics at the University of South Florida.

In 2001, Routledge published his book Time and Money: The Macroeconomics of Capital Structure. That year, he was a recipient of the Vernon Smith Prize for the Advancement of Austrian Economics.

Writing for Liberty Fund, Garrison explained that Capital-Based Macroeconomics "focuses on the internal integrity of capital's temporal structure and on the structure's overall compatibility with the time preferences and saving behavior of market participants." He added that his "fundamental idea is that if interest rates, broadly conceived, are allowed to be determined by unhampered market mechanisms, the temporal structure of capital will tend to be consistent with consumers’ (and savers’) preferred temporal pattern of consumption. And conversely, if interest rates are manipulated by a central monetary authority, the temporal structure will develop internal inconsistencies, will be at odds with the preferred temporal pattern, and will give rise to booms and busts."

On 13 February 2026, Garrison died in Auburn, Alabama, at the age of 82.

== See also ==
- Kaleidics
