= Skelton (surname) =

Skelton is a surname. Notable people with the surname include:

- Aaron Skelton (born 1974), English former footballer
- Arnoldus Jones Skelton (c. 1750–1793), English Member of Parliament
- Arvonne Fraser (née Skelton; 1925–2018), American women's rights activist
- Aylmer Skelton (1884–1959), Anglican bishop
- B. R. Skelton (born 1933), American politician
- Barbara Skelton (1916–1996), English memoirist, novelist and socialite, mistress of King Farouk of Egypt
- Betty Skelton (1926–2011), American women's land speed record holder, aerobatics aviator and aviation record holder
- Bevil Skelton (1641–1696), British diplomat and army officer
- Bill Skelton (1920–2003), British Second World War RAF navigator credited, with pilot Branse Burbridge, with 21 victories
- Bill Skelton (jockey) (1931-2016), New Zealand jockey and brother of Bob Skelton (jockey)
- Bob Skelton (jockey) (1934-2016), New Zealand jockey and brother of Bill Skelton (jockey)
- Bob Skelton (swimmer) (1903–1977), American swimmer, Olympic champion and world record holder
- Byron George Skelton (1905–2004), American judge
- Cameron Skelton (born 1995), New Zealand rugby union player
- Carol Skelton (born 1945), Canadian politician
- Charles Skelton (1806–1879), American politician
- Charlie Skelton, English comedy writer
- Craig Skelton (born 1980), English footballer
- Dudley Skelton (1878–1962), British Army lieutenant-general
- Gavin Skelton (born 1981), English football coach, manager and former player
- Geoffrey Skelton (1916–1998), British author and translator
- George Skelton (footballer) (1919–1994), English footballer
- George Skelton (politician) (1826–1920), Canadian politician
- Harry Skelton (born 1990), British jockey
- Helen Skelton (born 1983), British television presenter
- Henrietta Skelton (1839/1842–1900), German-born Canadian-American social reformer, writer, organizer and lecturer
- Ike Skelton (1931–2013), American politician
- John Skelton (c.1460–1529), English poet
- John Skelton (American football) (born 1988), American football quarterback
- Joseph John Skelton (1783–1871), English engraver, brother of William Skelton
- Josh Skelton (born 2001), British racing driver
- Karen Skelton (born 1961), American political strategist and lawyer
- Katie Skelton (born 1987), British synchronized swimmer
- Keith Skelton (1918–1995), American politician
- Kenneth Skelton (1918–2003), Anglican bishop
- Louise Skelton, British equestrian
- Matt Skelton (born 1967), British former boxer, kickboxer, and mixed martial artist
- Matthew Skelton, writer
- Melissa M. Skelton (born 1951), Anglican bishop
- Nellie Bangs Skelton (1855–1911), American composer, pianist, singer and vocal coach
- Nick Skelton (born 1957), British former equestrian show jumper
- Noel Skelton (1880–1935), Scottish British MP
- Oscar D. Skelton (1878–1941), Canadian political economist and civil servant
- Owen Ray Skelton (1886–1969), American automotive engineer and automobile designer
- Peter Skelton (1934–2009), New Zealand cricketer
- Philip Skelton (1707–1787), Irish Protestant clergyman and writer
- Raleigh Ashlin Skelton (1906–1970), English historian
- Red Skelton (1913–1997), American comedian, actor and painter
- Reginald Skelton (1872–1956), British vice-admiral, engineer and polar explorer
- Rich Skelton (born 1966), American former professional rodeo team roping world champion
- Robert Skelton (1896–1973), British newspaper editor
- Robert Skelton (politician) (born 1974), Australian politician
- Roy Skelton (1931–2011), British actor and voice actor
- Samuel Skelton (died 1634), first pastor of the First Church of Salem, Massachusetts
- Sean Skelton (born 1971), South Africa former rugby league footballer
- Simon Skelton (born 1972), English lawn bowler
- Sophie Skelton (born 1994), English actress
- Stuart Skelton (born 1968), Australian opera singer
- Thomas Skelton (1928–1994), American lighting designer
- Thomas Skelton (MP died 1416), English politician
- Thomas de Skelton, Member of Parliament for Cumberland (UK Parliament constituency) in 1313 and 1316
- Tommy Skelton (1856?–1900), British jockey
- Will Skelton (born 1992), Australian rugby player
- William de Skelton, English medieval college fellow and university chancellor
- Walter Skelton (1883–1979), Australian politician
- Walter Skelton (Victoria) (1864–1929), Australian accountant, businessman, politician and magistrate
- William Skelton (1763–1848), English engraver, brother of Joseph Skelton
