= Lindemann index =

In statistical physics, the Lindemann index is a simple measure of thermally driven disorder in atoms or molecules. It is named after Frederick Lindemann, who formulated it in 1910.

== Definition ==
The local Lindemann index is defined as:

$q_i = \frac{1}{N - 1} \sum_{j \neq i} \frac{\sqrt{\langle r_{ij}^2\rangle - \langle r_{ij} \rangle^2 }}{\langle r_{ij} \rangle}$

where angle brackets indicate a time average. The global Lindemann index is a system average of this quantity.

In condensed matter physics
a departure from linearity in the behaviour of the global Lindemann index or an increase above a threshold value related to the spacing between atoms (or micelles, particles, globules, etc.) is often taken as the indication that a solid-liquid phase transition has taken place. See Lindemann melting criterion.

Biomolecules
often possess separate regions with different order characteristics. In order to quantify or illustrate local disorder, the local Lindemann index can be used.

== Factors when using the Lindemann index ==
Care must be taken if the molecule possesses globally defined dynamics, such as about a hinge or pivot, because these motions will obscure the local motions which the Lindemann index is designed to quantify. An appropriate tactic in this circumstance is to sum the r_{ij} only over a small number of neighbouring atoms to arrive at each q_{i}. A further variety of such modifications to the Lindemann index are available and have different merits, e.g. for the study of glassy vs crystalline materials.
