= Derek Jackson =

British physicist (1906–1982)

Derek Jackson OBE, DFC, AFC, FRS
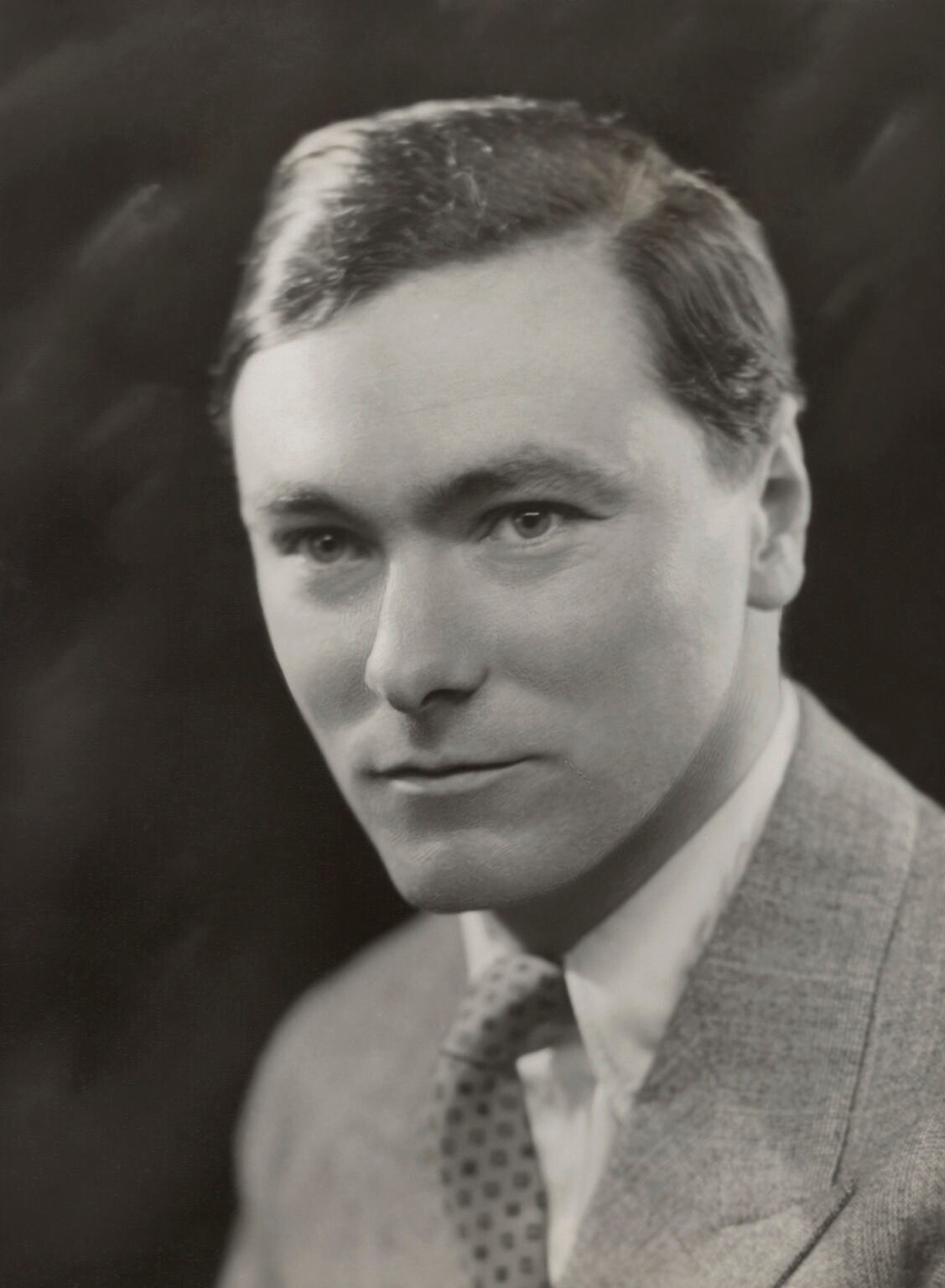
- Born: Derek Ainslie Jackson; 23 June 1906
- Died: 20 February 1982 (aged 75); Lausanne, Switzerland
- Education: Rugby School
- Alma mater: Trinity College, Cambridge
- Known for: Atomic physics
- Spouse(s): Elizabeth John (m. 1931; div. 1935) Pamela Mitford (m. 1936; div. 1951) Janetta Woolley (m. 1951; div. 1956) Consuelo Eyre (m. 1957; div. 1959) Barbara Skelton (m. 1966; div. 1967) Marie Christine Reille (m. 1968)
- Parents: Charles James Jackson (father); Ada Elizabeth Williams (mother)
- Awards: Fellow of the Royal Society
- Scientific career
- Fields: Spectroscopy
- Workplaces: Clarendon Laboratory, Oxford
- Doctoral advisor: Frederick A. Lindemann
- Military career
- Allegiance: United Kingdom
- Branch: Royal Air Force
- Unit: No. 604 (County of Middlesex) Squadron
- Conflicts: World War II
- Awards: DFC, AFC

Derek Ainslie Jackson, OBE, DFC, AFC, FRS (23 June 1906 – 20 February 1982) was a British physicist.

== Biography ==
Derek Jackson was born in 1906, the son of Welsh businessman Sir Charles Jackson. He was one of a pair of twins; his twin brother was Charles Vivian Jackson (1906–1936), known as Vivian. Derek was educated at Rugby School and Trinity College, Cambridge, where he took a first in part I of the natural sciences tripos and graduated with honours in 1927. Jackson showed early promise in the field of spectroscopy under the guidance of Professor Frederick Lindemann, making the first quantitative determination of a nuclear magnetic spin using atomic spectroscopy to measure the hyperfine structure of caesium. His scientific research at Oxford did not, however, interfere with his other great passion – steeplechase riding – which led him from the foxhunting field to his first ride in the Grand National of 1935. A keen huntsman, he took up the sport again after the war, riding in two more Nationals, in 1947 and 1948.

In World War II, Jackson distinguished himself in the RAF, making an important scientific contribution to Britain's air defences and to the bomber offensive. He flew more than a thousand hours as a navigator, many of them in combat in night-fighters, with No. 604 (County of Middlesex) Squadron based at RAF Middle Wallop. He was decorated with the DFC, AFC and OBE. This war record stands in contrast to his stated desire at the war's inception to keep Britain out of fighting Germany. For the rest of his life, Jackson, appointed a Fellow of the Royal Society in 1947, lived as a tax exile in Ireland, France and Switzerland. He continued his spectroscopic work in France at the Centre national de la recherche scientifique, and was made a chevalier de la Légion d'honneur.

A "rampant bisexual", Jackson was married six times, and also lived for three years with Angela Culme-Seymour, the half-sister of Janetta Woolley, one of his wives. The others included a daughter of Augustus John, Pamela Mitford (one of the Mitford sisters), a princess (the widow of Ernest zu Hohenlohe), and several femmes fatales including Barbara Skelton (in whose obituary in The Independent is noted her remark that it was "not for love that (she) married Professor Jackson", he being identified as "the millionaire son of the founder of the News of the World").

== Books and publications ==
- Jackson, D. A. (1928). "Hyperfine structure in the arc spectrum of caesium and nuclear rotation". Proceedings of the Royal Society of London A. 121 (787): 432. Bibcode:1928RSPSA.121..432J. doi:10.1098/rspa.1928.0207.
