= Adolph Friedrich Lindemann =

British engineer and businessman (1846–1931)

- Born: 13 May 1846; Palatinate, German Empire
- Died: 25 August 1931 (aged 85); Marlow, Buckinghamshire, England
- Citizenship: German; British (from 1871)
- Occupations: Engineer; businessman; amateur astronomer
- Spouse: Olga Noble (m. 1884)
- Children: 3, including Frederick

Adolph Friedrich Lindemann (13 May 1846 – 25 August 1931) was a German-born British engineer, businessman, and amateur astronomer who was involved in the Transatlantic telegraph cable project. He was also the father of Frederick Lindemann, a physicist who served as an advisor to Winston Churchill during World War II.

== Life ==
Lindemann was born in the Palatinate to a Roman Catholic family established in Alsace-Lorraine under the Comte de Lindemann, who had married into the Cyprien-Fabre shipping family. Lindemann married Olga Noble (1851 – c. 1927), herself heiress to a wealthy New London, Connecticut, engineering family of British origin, and the widow of a banker named Davidson by whom she had produced three children. Olga was reputedly "vivacious and beautiful".

Lindemann had raised capital in the City of London to construct the waterworks in Speyer and Pirmasens; he was also involved in the Transatlantic telegraph cable project. He moved to England in the 1860s and became naturalised a British subject. The couple were wealthy, having an annual income of around £20,000 by 1914 (£1.5 million at 2003 prices). Olga inherited a mansion near Sidmouth, Devon, so her husband took the opportunity to establish a laboratory and astronomical observatory there. On Olga's death, Lindemann donated the observatory to the University of Exeter. Lindemann was elected a fellow of the Royal Astronomical Society on 14 February 1873. He was also elected a fellow of the Royal Meteorological Society on 19 March 1884.

== Family ==
The couple had a daughter and three sons, the second of whom, Frederick, was to become a famed physicist, and World War II adviser to Sir Winston Churchill. The youngest brother, Septimus, became something of a playboy on the French Riviera but became a notable agent for the intelligence services in World War II. Adolph's only daughter (he had two stepdaughters by his wife's previous marriage), Linda, became a short story writer and playwright, writing under a pseudonym to avoid family disapproval. One of her plays, The Man in the Case, was censored. Her granddaughter is novelist Salley Vickers, and her great-grandson Rupert Kingfisher, the children's writer of Madame Pamplemousse. Olga was a Protestant and insisted on the children being raised in the Anglican Church.

== Legacy ==
- The minor planet 828 Lindemannia is named for him.

== See also ==
- Winston Churchill
- Clarendon Laboratory
