= Emoia mivarti =

Conservation status
- Data Deficient (IUCN 3.1)

Scientific classification
- Kingdom: Animalia
- Phylum: Chordata
- Class: Reptilia
- Order: Squamata
- Family: Scincidae
- Genus: Emoia
- Species: E. mivarti

Binomial name
- Emoia mivarti (Boulenger, 1887)

Synonyms
- Lygosoma mivarti Boulenger, 1887

Species of lizard

Emoia mivarti, also known commonly as Boulenger's emo skink and the Admiralty five-striped skink, is a species of lizard in the subfamily Eugongylinae of the family Scincidae. The species is native to the Admiralty Islands and Indonesia.

== Etymology ==
The specific name, mivarti, is in honor of English Naturalist St. George Jackson Mivart.

== Geographic distribution ==
Emoia mivarti is found on several of the Admiralty Islands of Papua New Guinea.

== Habitat ==
The preferred natural habitat of Emoia mivarti is forest, but it has also been found in gardens.

== Behavior ==
Emoia mivarti is terrestrial, foraging on the ground in leaf litter.

== Reproduction ==
Emoia mivarti is oviparous.
