= Helen Makower =

British economist

Helen Makower (1 June 1910 in London – 17 May 1998 in Marlborough, Wiltshire) was a British economist. She was the daughter of the writer and music critic Stanley Makower. Graduating from Newnham College, Cambridge (M.A. Oxon, inc. awarded 1938, and with a Ph.D. in Economics (London School of Economics and Political Science) 1937, she joined Jacob Marschak's Oxford Institute of Statistics before serving in Frederick Lindemann's S-Branch, Sir Winston Churchill's private economics and statistics service, during World War II. After the war, she served briefly with the British Control Commission in Germany and later with the United Nations, before returning to academia and the London School of Economics, where she retired as a Reader in 1977. Makower was at the forefront of the statistical turn in the British economics of the 1930s, and remained an influential figure after the war, acting as an important link between the mathematical economics developed at the Cowles Commission and British economics.

== Works ==
- Makower, H. and Marschak, J., 1938. Assets, prices and monetary theory. Economica, 5(19), pp.261-288.
- Makower H., J. Marschak, H.W. Robinson (1939-40) Studies in mobility of labor: analysis for Great Britain, Pt I& II Oxford Economic Papers, 4 (1940), pp. 39-62
- Makower, Helen, Activity Analysis and the Theory of Economic Equilibrium (London : Macmillan 1957).

== Bibliography ==
- Lancaster, K. J. (1987), "Makower, Helen". In J. Eatwell, M. Milgate, and P. Newman, The New Palgrave, vol. 3, London: Macmillan, p. 280.
