= Kaleidics =

Term in economic theory

The term kaleidics (Greek: καλός kalos: "good", "beautiful"; εἶδος eidos: "form", "shape") denotes the ever-changing shape and status of an economy. Uncertainty is the primary kaleidic factor. It is strongly associated with the work of George Shackle, who had a rather radical interpretation of Keynesian economic theory. He surmised that the uncertainty in a capitalist economy was due to the irrational nature of investment, which is often driven by irrational fears, rumors, and superstition, rather than what is traditionally assumed to be cold, hard, calculation. Such theories lead to the view, expressed in Viennese kaleidics, that the turbulence of markets cannot be smoothed through government interference, and must therefore be left to their own devices.

== Uncertainty in economics ==
British economist George Lennox Sharman Shackle, who has been characterised as a post-Keynesian but also as influenced by Austrian economics, made an attempt to challenge classical rational choice theory. He used the term "kaleidostatics" (or "kaleido-statics"), derived from "kaleidoscope", to describe the status of the economy in the particular posture which prevails at any point in time, a status due to "particular expectations, or rather, particular agreed formulas about the future, [as] are for the moment widely accepted." This status, however, as Shackle continues in defining the term, "can change as swiftly, as completely, and on as slight a provocation as the loose, ephemeral mosaic of the kaleidoscope. A twist of the hand, a piece of 'news', can shatter one picture and replace it with a different one." Therefore, it is anything but stable.

German economist Ludwig Lachmann, an important contributor to the Austrian School, stated, in agreement with Shackle, that the magnitude of profits in an economy, in each period, is shaped mainly by "short-period forces." Lachmann wrote that "a long-run force" is at work, all the time, tending to eliminate these price/cost differences and asserted that "in a long-run equilibrium, in which, by definition, the equilibrating forces have finally prevailed over all the forces of disruption, there are no profits."

The persistence of profits in a market economy, Lachmann's argument went, is due to the persistence of disequilibrium in some sector of the economic system; "As in a kaleidoscope, the constellation of forces operating in the system as a whole is ever changing." And, Lachmann concluded, it is "kaleido-statics rather than static equilibrium" the method of analysis that is most appropriate to "the reality of the market economy." This led Lachmann to assert that an "equilibrium rate of profit is...a contradiction in terms."

Critics of the notion of "kaleidics" view it as eliminating the prospect of advancing a claim about an objective reality, and to be replacing such claims with statements that are the private property of the observer.

== Keynesian kaleidics ==
John Maynard Keynes insisted upon dividing the total demand for money into several separate demands, each identified with some specific purpose. In the 1937 article, titled "The General Theory of Employment", in which he elaborates on his 1936 book, The General Theory of Employment, Interest and Money, Keynes asserts, in effect, that the demand for money in the present derives from the uncertainty of our knowledge about the future - and that the fact that human knowledge of the future is "fluctuating, vague and uncertain, renders wealth a peculiarly unsuitable subject for the methods of the classical economic theory." The kind of uncertainty that Keynes is referring to is the same kind that Lachmann associates with radical subjectivism. In fact, according to Keynes, "We simply do not know."

This sentiment is echoed in Shackle's subsequent, firm assertion, on the same premise, that "economics isn't a science, and we ought not to call it a science." Shackle, in fact, was quite clear that "there is pretty complete in-determinacy" in our view towards the future. He stated, "I did spend a lot of energy trying to see if I could devise any theory of how expectations are formed and I ended with the conclusion that expectations are far too elusive and subtle to find out any principles or rules to explain their emergence." This agrees with what Keynes had written earlier, in his 1937 article, about us having, as a rule, "only the vaguest idea of any but the most direct consequences of our acts."

== Viennese kaleidics ==
Richard E. Wagner, going beyond the "idea of a kaleidic economy or society" that is "strongly associated with George Shackle and his vision of Keynesian kaleidics", asserted that "the central thrust of the Austrian tradition in economic analysis can be described by the term 'Viennese kaleidics'." Wagner argues that, in either version of kaleidics, the analytical stress is placed on treating time seriously and not just notionally, which, Wagner claimed, "leads in turn to recognition that economic processes are better treated as turbulent than as equilibrated." Although Wagner recognized that turbulence is a natural feature of the unavoidable incompleteness of intertemporal coordination, he submits that it is subject to mitigation and concludes that "individual liberty and private ordering [are] generally superior to state policy and public ordering in calming the turbulence that naturally characterizes a kaleidic society."

According to Wagner, the Walrasian idea of an orderly system of relationships has pervaded the corpus of Austrian theory and Ludwig von Mises’ (1966) formulation of an evenly rotating economy gives recognition to this systemic quality. Moreover, as Wagner also points out, Friedrich Hayek’s (1932) treatment of the business cycle as departing from a position of Walrasian equilibrium is a similar effort.

== Keynesians vs Austrians ==
Notable Austrians consider the notion of kaleidics, as proposed by Shackle and Lachmann, who were considered as adherents, in general, to be "an alien injection into [the Austrian tradition], an approach that offers only "corruption of hard-gained truths." The Austrian criticism reflects the belief that a kaleidic vision is contrary to the effort to uncover and articulate "objective claims about reality," and essentially promotes a nihilist point of view, "where analysts are free to see what they choose to see."

In this respect, Murray Rothbard titled one essay "The Hermeneutical Invasion of Philosophy and Economics" (1990), and Joseph Salerno, in his treatment of what he regards as Lachmann's nihilism, reports that Rothbard referred to "a disease" that has been infecting Austrian seminar rooms called "Lachmannia". Leland Yeager, in the same vein, counseled Austrian theorists not to be scornful of theories of general equilibrium.

In contrast to the Austrian critics who perceived kaleidics as nihilistic, Stephen Parsons argued that it is orthodox economics, instead, with "its readiness to embrace fictive models that give definitive answers to questions, that is nihilistic," while Warren Samuels asserted that "if the charge of nihilism is applied to any system of thought that leaves the future open, nihilism is superior to the alternative."

== Current expectations ==
Austrian-school American economist Roger Garrison accepts that "expectations are not rational in the strong sense of that term", but claims that they become more rational "with increased levels of policy activism and with cumulative experience with the consequences of it." Garrison characterizes expectations as adaptive, though he clarifies that they adapt "not just to changes in some particular price, wage rate, or interest rate, but also to the changing level of understanding that corresponds to the overlap" between local knowledge of conditions in some particular market and global knowledge of theories about how markets work, including those held by the regulator.

== See also ==
- Uncertainty
- Ergodicity
- Determinism
- Chaos theory
- Animal spirits

== Bibliography ==
- Garrison, Roger:
  - "The kaleidic world of Ludwig Lachmann: Review of The Market as an Economic Process", in Critical Review, vol. 1, issue #3 (Summer), 1987, pp. 77–89
  - "An Agenda for Macroeconomics" in South African Journal of Economics, vol. 65, #4, December 1997, pp. 459–481
- Katzner, Donald W., UMassAmherst: Time, ignorance, and uncertainty in economic models, University of Michigan Press, 1998, ISBN 9780472109388, pp. 486
- Lachmann, L. M.:
  - Macro-economic Thinking and the Market Economy: An essay on the neglect of the micro-foundations and its consequences, Institute of Economic Affairs, 1973
  - The Market as an Economic Process, New York: Basil Blackwell, 1986, pp. xii, 173
- Parsons, Stephen, D.: "Shackle, Nihilism, and the Subject of Economics", Review of Political Economy, 1993, Vol.5, pp. 217–35
- Samuels, Warren J.: “In (Limited but Affirmative) Defense of Nihilism” Review of Political Economy, 1993 Vol.5, pp. 236–44.
- Shackle, G. L. S.:
  - A Scheme of Economic Theory, Cambridge University Press, 1965
  - Epistemics & Economics: A Critique of Economic Doctrines, Transaction Publishers, 1972, ISBN 1-56000-558-0
  - Keynesian Kaleidics: The Evolution of a General Political Economy, Edinburgh University Press, 1974, ISBN 978-0852242605
  - Interview to the Ludwig von Mises Institute, Spring 1983
- Wagner, Richard E.: "Viennese Kaleidics: Why Liberty and Not Policy Calms Turbulence", George Mason University Dept of Economics, GMU Working Paper in Economics No. 11-46, October 2011
