= 828 Lindemannia =

Main-belt asteroid

Discovery
- Discovered by: Johann Palisa
- Discovery site: University of Vienna
- Discovery date: 29 August 1916

Designations
- Pronunciation: /lɪndəˈmæmiə/
- Alternative designations: 1916 ZX

Orbital characteristics
- Epoch 31 July 2016 (JD 2457600.5)
- Uncertainty parameter 0
- Observation arc: 110.46 yr (40346 d)
- Aphelion: 3.2885 AU (491.95 Gm)
- Perihelion: 3.1028 AU (464.17 Gm)
- Semi-major axis: 3.1956 AU (478.05 Gm)
- Eccentricity: 0.029046
- Orbital period (sidereal): 5.71 yr (2086.6 d)
- Mean anomaly: 256.3941°
- Mean motion: 0° 10^{m} 21.108^{s} / day
- Inclination: 1.1286°
- Longitude of ascending node: 1.9327°
- Argument of perihelion: 289.9690°
- Earth MOID: 2.08656 AU (312.145 Gm)
- Jupiter MOID: 1.76068 AU (263.394 Gm)
- T_{Jupiter}: 3.195

Physical characteristics
- Mean radius: 26.695±0.75 km
- Synodic rotation period: 20.52 h (0.855 d)
- Geometric albedo: 0.0457±0.003
- Apparent magnitude: 10.33
- Absolute magnitude (H): 10.33

828 Lindemannia is a minor planet orbiting the Sun with an orbital period of five years and 255 days. It was discovered on 29 August 1916 at the University of Vienna by Johann Palisa. It is named after Adolph Friedrich Lindemann, a British astronomer, engineer and businessman.

== See also ==
- List of asteroids/1–1000
