= Skeleton (disambiguation) =

A skeleton is a biological system providing support in a living organism.

Skeleton or skeletons may also refer to:

== Science and computers ==
=== Biology ===
- Human skeleton, human anatomy
- Skeletonization (forensics), refers to the complete decomposition of the non-bony tissues of a corpse, leading to a bare skeleton
- Skeletonizer (disambiguation), a common name for several species of moth

=== Mathematics ===
- n-skeleton, the subcomplex of a simplicial complex or CW complex consisting of all faces of or below a certain dimension
- Skeleton (category theory), in mathematics, every category has a skeleton in which no two distinct objects are isomorphic
- Straight skeleton, in geometry, is a method of representing a polygon

=== Computers ===
- Skeleton (computer programming), a style of computer programming
- Algorithmic skeleton, a style of parallel programming based on simple high-level patterns
- Skeletal animation, a computer technique used to animate 3D characters
- Topological skeleton, a digital image processing technique used to detect objects and regions within images
- Morphological skeleton in digital image processing
- Class skeleton, an outline of a class used in software engineering

=== Other ===
- Skeletal formula, in chemistry, the skeletal structure or skeleton of a molecule

== Music ==
=== Bands ===
- Skeletons (band), an American indie rock group
- Skeletonwitch, an American thrash metal group
- Skeletal Family, a British rock band

=== Albums ===
- Skeleton (Abe Vigoda album) or the title song, 2008
- Skeleton (Figurines album), 2005
- Skeletons (Danzig album), 2015
- Skeletons (Hawthorne Heights album), 2010
- Skeletons (Nothingface album), 2003
- Skeletons (Sirens and Sailors album) or the title song, 2013
- Skeletons (Wednesday 13 album) or the title song, 2008
- Skeletons, by Brothers Osborne or the title song, 2020
- Skeletons, by Seven Story Drop, 2008
- Skeletons, by Pop Evil, 2023

=== Songs ===
- "Skeleton" (song), by Donghae & Eunhyuk, 2014
- "Skeletons" (Dihaj song), representing Azerbaijan at Eurovision 2017
- "Skeletons" (Pop Evil song), 2023
- "Skeletons" (Stevie Wonder song), 1987
- "Skeletons" (Travis Scott song), 2018
- "Skeletons" (Yeah Yeah Yeahs song), 2010
- "The Skeleton", by Quasi from Field Studies, 1999
- "Skeletons", by Moka Only from Lime Green, 2001
- "Skeleton", by Bloc Party from Little Thoughts, 2004
- "Skeletons", by Tulisa from The Female Boss, 2012
- "Skeletons", by James Arthur from Back from the Edge, 2016

== Television and film ==
- "Skeletons" (CSI: Miami), an episode from season 4 of the American crime drama CSI: Miami
- "Skeletons", an episode of the fourth season of NCIS
- "The Skeleton", a 1979 episode of the TV sitcom The Ropers
- Skeletons (2010 film), a film by Nick Whitfield
- Skeletons (upcoming film), an upcoming American horror film
- Skeletons (1997 film), a television film by David DeCoteau
- The Skeleton, a fictional character from the novel Something Wicked This Way Comes

== Games ==
- Skeleton (sport) (or tobogganing), a fast winter sliding sport
- Skeleton (Guitar Hero), a playable character in the Xbox 360 version of the video game Guitar Hero: World Tour
- Skeleton (Dungeons & Dragons), an undead creature from the Dungeons & Dragons fantasy roleplaying game
- Skeleton+, an Atari 2600 video game in Activision Anthology

== Other ==
- "Skeleton", a 1945 short story by Ray Bradbury
- Skeleton (undead), in fantasy, an undead, animated skeleton
- Skeleton key, a type of key
- Skeleton watch, a type of watch where the gearing is visible
- Skeleton crew or staff, a reduced number of staff working off-hours or during a labour strike
- Skeleton Creek (disambiguation)
- Skeleton suit, a 19th-century fashion in boys' clothing
- Skeleton in the closet (idiom), an undisclosed negative fact about someone

== See also ==
- Bone, a rigid organ that constitutes part of the vertebrate skeleton.
- Exoskeleton, an exterior skeleton
- Endoskeleton, an interior skeleton
- Hydroskeleton, a skeleton supported by fluid pressure
- Cytoskeleton, an element present in all cells of all domains of life
- Lich, sometimes mistaken as a normal skeleton
- Skelethon, an album by Aesop Rock
- Skeletor, a fictional character in Masters of the Universe
- Skelton (disambiguation), a place name and surname
