= Skeleton Creek =

Skeleton Creek may refer to:

- Skeleton Creek (Oklahoma), a river in Oklahoma
- Skeleton Creek (Queensland) in Cairns, Queensland, Australia
- Skeleton Creek (Victoria)
  - Skeleton Creek Trail, which runs alongside the southern section Melbourne's Skeleton Creek
- Skeleton Creek (novel), the first novel in the Skeleton Creek Saga by Patrick Carman
