= Johnson, Indiana =

- Unincorporated community
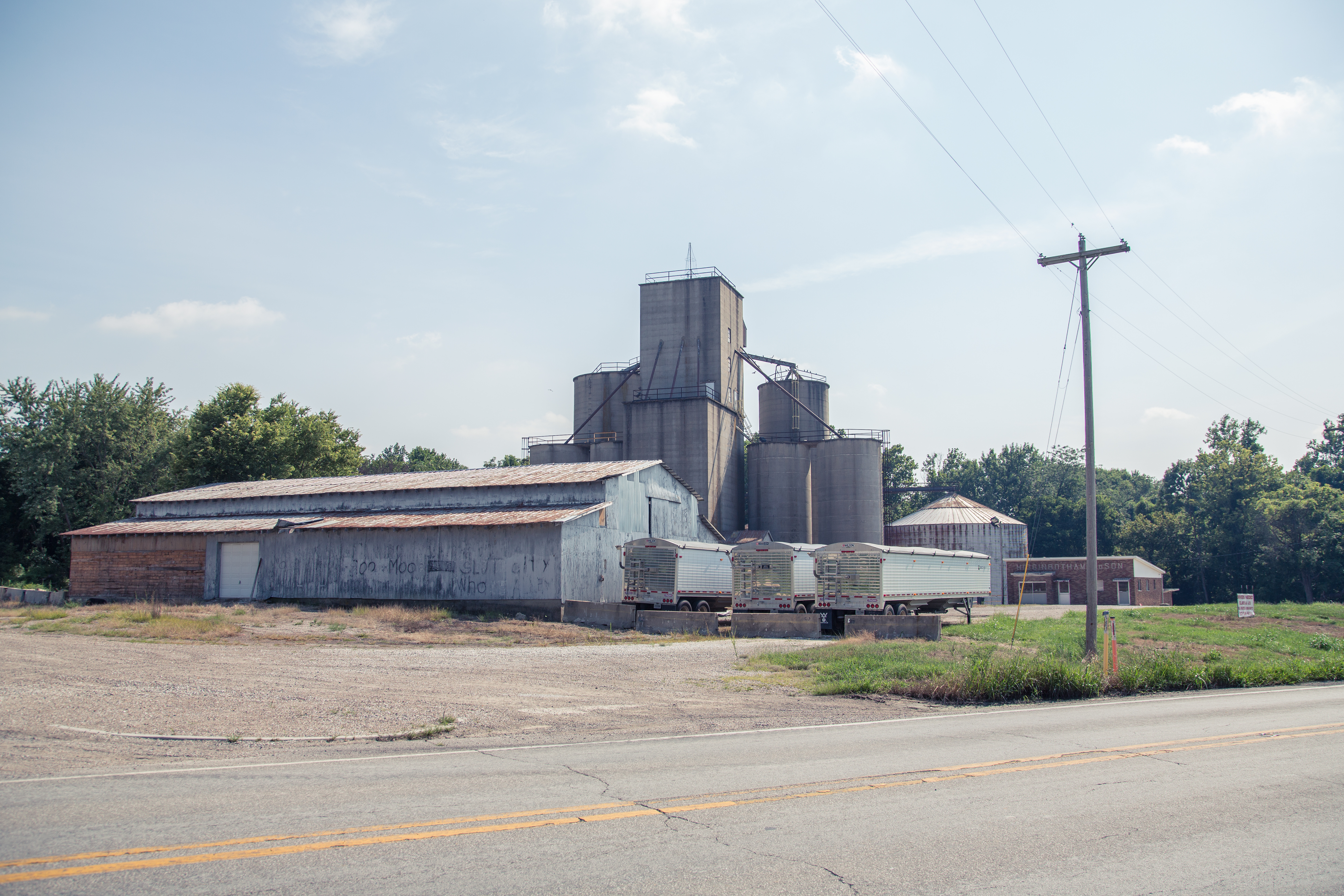

- Location within Indiana Location within the United States
- Coordinates: 38°16′26″N 87°44′53″W
- Country: United States
- State: Indiana
- County: Gibson
- Township: Montgomery
- Elevation: 440 ft (130 m)
- ZIP code: 47665
- GNIS feature ID: 2830386

Johnson is an unincorporated town and Census designated place in Montgomery Township, Gibson County, Indiana, United States. It is located roughly four miles west of Owensville and eight miles north of Poseyville.

== History ==
A post office was established at Johnson in 1914, and remained in operation until it was discontinued in 1930. The community was named for Mr. Johnson, a railroad official. The original site was just one of many villages for the Native American tribe of Piankeshaw.

== Demographics ==
The United States Census Bureau delineated Johnson as a census designated place in the 2022 American Community Survey.
