= S-Branch =

Academic group

The S-Branch was a small group of academic economists in the UK, established in 1939 at the Admiralty by Frederick Lindemann. Its role was to report directly to prime minister Winston Churchill distilling complex data into succinct charts and figures, to aid speedy evaluation. Members of the S-Branch included Sir Roy Harrod, G. L. S. Shackle, Helen Makower and later, D. G. Champernowne and David Bensusan-Butt. The operation of this statistical branch often caused tensions between government departments, but it was important because it allowed Churchill to make quick decisions based on accurate data.
