= Jacob Marschak =

American economist (1898–1977)

- Born: 23 July 1898; Kiev, Russian Empire
- Died: 27 July 1977 (aged 79); Los Angeles, California, U.S.
- Education: University of Berlin; University of Heidelberg
- Known for: Elasticity of demand Early econometrics Choice under uncertainty
- Scientific career
- Fields: Economics
- Workplaces: Cowles Commission; University of Chicago
- Doctoral advisor: Emil Lederer
- Doctoral students: Leonid Hurwicz; Harry Markowitz; Franco Modigliani

Jacob Marschak (Russian: Яков Израилевич (Срулевич) Маршак, romanized: Yakov Izrailevich (Srulevich) Marshak; 22 July 1898 – 27 July 1977) was a Russian and American economist. Affiliated with the Mensheviks in his youth, he had a brief participation in the Russian Revolution, serving as labour minister in the Terek Soviet Republic before emigrating. In exile he developed a successful scholarly career, first in Germany and later achieving prominence in United States academia.

== Life ==
Born in a Jewish family of Kiev, Jacob Marschak (until 1933 Jakob) was the son of a jeweler. During his studies, he joined the social democratic Menshevik Party, becoming a member of the Menshevik International Caucus. In 1918, he was the labor minister in the Terek Soviet Republic. In 1919, he emigrated to Germany, where he studied at the University of Berlin and the University of Heidelberg.

Early in his émigré period he remained active in Russian socialist circles, contributing to the Menshevik journal Sotsialisticheskii vestnik, published in Berlin. From 1922 to 1926, he was a journalist, and in 1928, he joined the new Kiel Institut für Weltwirtschaft. With the gathering Nazi storm, he emigrated to England, where he went to Oxford to teach at the Oxford Institute of Statistics, which was funded by the Rockefeller Foundation, allowing him to emigrate to the United States in 1939. After teaching at the New School for Social Research, in 1943, he went to University of Chicago, where he led the Cowles Commission. He followed the commission's move to Yale University, and he then became a professor at UCLA in 1960.

In 1972, he co-founded Team Theory with Roy Radner.

Marschak was fluent in approximately one dozen languages. Shortly before he was due to become president of the American Economic Association, he died from a cardiac arrest.

UCLA sponsors the recurring Jacob Marschak Interdisciplinary Colloquium on Mathematics in the Behavior Sciences.

== Major publications ==
=== Books ===
- Marschak, Jacob (1930). Die Lohndiskussion. J.C.B. Mohr (Paul Siebeck) Tübingen.
- Marschak, Jacob (1931). Elastizität der Nachfrage. Zur empirischen Feststellung relativer Marktkonstanten durch Beobachtung von Haushalt, Betrieb und Markt. J.C.B. Mohr (Paul Siebeck) Tübingen.
- Marschak, Jacob; Lederer, Emil (1937). The new middle class. Isha Books.
- Marschak, Jacob (1954). Three lectures on probability in the social sciences. Chicago: Cowles Commission for Research in Economics. OCLC 760721040.
- Marschak, Jacob; Radner, Roy (1972). Economic theory of teams.
- Marschak, Jacob (1974). Economics, information, decision and prediction, Selected Essays, 3 Volumes. Reidel: Dordrecht and Boston, MA. ISBN 9789027711960.

=== Chapters in books ===
- Marschak, Jacob; Lederer, Emil (18 March 2018), "Der neue Mittelstand", in Lederer, Jacob (ed.), Grundriss der Sozialökonomik, IX, Abteilung, I. Teil, J.C.B. Mohr (Paul Siebeck) Tübingen 1926, Forgotten Books (reprinted), ISBN 9780364940488.

Translates as:Marschak, Jacob; Lederer, Emil, "New middle class", in Lederer, Jacob (ed.), New middle class, Isha Books, ISBN 9789332875661.

- Marschak, Jacob (1951), "Why "should" statisticians and businessmen maximize "moral expectation"?", in California Press, University of (ed.), Proceedings of the second Berkeley symposium on mathematical statistics and probability, vol. 2, Berkeley, California: University of California Press, pp. 493–506.
- Marschak, Jacob (1954), "Towards an economic theory of organization and information", in Thrall, Robert McDowell (ed.), Decision Processes, New York: Wiley, OCLC 639321.
- Marschak, Jacob; Radner, Roy (1954), "Note on some proposed decision criteria", in Thrall, Robert McDowell (ed.), Decision Processes, New York: Wiley, OCLC 639321.
- Marschak, Jacob (1960), "Binary-choice constraints and random utility indicators", in Arrow, Kenneth J.; Karlin, Samuel; Suppes, Patrick (eds.), Mathematical models in the social sciences, 1959: Proceedings of the first Stanford symposium, Stanford mathematical studies in the social sciences, IV, Stanford, California: Stanford University Press, pp. 312–329.
- Marschak, Jacob; Davidson, D. (1971), "Experimental tests of a Stochastic decision theory", in Churchman, Ratoosh (ed.), Measurement definitions and theories, Elsevier, ISBN 9780720431902.
- Marschak, Jacob (1974), "Introductory note", in Marschak, Jacob (ed.), Economic, information, decision and prediction, Springer, pp. 3–4, ISBN 9789027711960.
- Marschak, Jacob (1974), "Towards an economic theory of organization and information (1954)", in Marschak, Jacob (ed.), Economic, information, decision and prediction, Springer, pp. 29–62, ISBN 9789027711960.
- Marschak, Jacob (1974), "Elements for a theory of teams (1955)", in Marschak, Jacob (ed.), Economic, information, decision and prediction, Springer, pp. 63–76, ISBN 9789027711960.
- Marschak, Jacob (1974), "Efficient and viable organizational forms (1959)", in Marschak, Jacob (ed.), Economic, information, decision and prediction, Springer, pp. 77–90, ISBN 9789027711960.
- Marschak, Jacob (1974), "Remarks on the economics of information (1959)", in Marschak, Jacob (ed.), Economic, information, decision and prediction, Springer, pp. 91–117, ISBN 9789027711960.
- Marschak, Jacob (1974), "Theory of an efficient several person firm (1960)", in Marschak, Jacob (ed.), Economic, information, decision and prediction, Springer, pp. 118–125, ISBN 9789027711960.
- Marschak, Jacob (1974), "Problems in information economics (1964)", in Marschak, Jacob (ed.), Economic, information, decision and prediction, Springer, pp. 126–164, ISBN 9789027711960.
- Marschak, Jacob (1974), "The cost of decision making: an interdisciplinary discussion (1956)", in Marschak, Jacob (ed.), Economic, information, decision and prediction, Springer, pp. 165–182, ISBN 9789027711960.
- Marschak, Jacob (1974), "Economics of language (1965)", in Marschak, Jacob (ed.), Economic, information, decision and prediction, Springer, pp. 183–192, ISBN 9789027711960.
- Marschak, Jacob (1974), "Economic planning and the cost of thinking (1966)", in Marschak, Jacob (ed.), Economic, information, decision and prediction, Springer, pp. 193–200, ISBN 9789027711960.
- Marschak, Jacob (1974), "Economics of inquiring, communicating, deciding (1968)", in Marschak, Jacob (ed.), Economic, information, decision and prediction, Springer, pp. 250–269, ISBN 9789027711960.
- Marschak, Jacob (1974), "Economics of information systems (1971)", in Marschak, Jacob (ed.), Economic, information, decision and prediction, Springer, pp. 270–341, ISBN 9789027711960.
- Marschak, Jacob (1974), "Optimal systems for information and decision (1972)", in Marschak, Jacob (ed.), Economic, information, decision and prediction, Springer, pp. 342–355, ISBN 9789027711960.
- Marschak, Jacob (1960), "Random orderings and Stochastic theories of responses", in Block, H.D. (ed.), Contributions to probability and statistics.
- Marschak, Jacob (1960), "Remarks on the economics of information", in LastName, FirstName (ed.), Contributions to scientific research in management.
- Marschak, Jacob (1960), "Binary-choice constraints and random utility indicators", in Arrow, Kenneth J.; Karlin, Samuel; Suppes, Patrick (eds.), Mathematical models in the social sciences, 1959: Proceedings of the first Stanford symposium, Stanford mathematical studies in the social sciences, IV, Stanford, California: Stanford University Press, pp. 312–329.
- Marschak, Jacob (1971), "Economics and information systems", in Intriligator, Michael; Kendrick, David A. (eds.), Frontiers of quantitative economics, Elsevier, ISBN 9780720431902.

=== Journal articles ===
- Marschak, Jacob (1923). "Wirtschaftsrechnung und Gemeinwirtschaft". Archiv für Sozialwissenschaft.
- Marschak, Jacob (1930). "Das Kaufkraft-Argument in der Lohnpolitik". Magazin der Wirtschaft.
- Marschak, Jacob (October 1933). "Annual survey of statistical information: the branches of national spending". Econometrica. 1 (4): 373–386. doi:10.2307/1907329. JSTOR 1907329.
- Marschak, Jacob (October 1938). "Money and the theory of assets". Econometrica. 6 (4): 311–325. doi:10.2307/1905409. JSTOR 1905409.
- Marschak, Jacob; Makower, H. (August 1938). "Assets, prices and monetary theory". Economica. 5 (19): 261–288. doi:10.2307/2548629. JSTOR 2548629.
- Marschak, Jacob (June 1941). "A discussion on methods in economics". The Journal of Political Economy. 49 (3). The University of Chicago Press: 441–448. doi:10.1086/255725. JSTOR 1824738. S2CID 154589379.
- Marschak, Jacob; Andrews, William H. (October 1944). "Random simultaneous equations and the theory of production". Econometrica. 12 (3–4): 143–205. doi:10.2307/1905432. JSTOR 1905432.
- Marschak, Jacob (June 1945). "A cross-section of business cycle discussion". The American Economic Review. 35 (3). American Economic Association: 368–381. JSTOR 1811447.
- Marschak, Jacob (April 1946). "Neumann's and Morgenstern's New Approach to Static Economics". The Journal of Political Economy. 54 (2): 97–115. doi:10.1086/256327. JSTOR 1825790. S2CID 154536775.
- Marschak, Jacob (November 1947). "On mathematics for economists". Review of Economics and Statistics. 29 (4): 269–273. doi:10.2307/1927826. JSTOR 1927826.
- Marschak, Jacob (1949). "Statistical inference from non-experimental observation: an economic example". In Proceedings of the International Statistical Conference Held in Washington, DC, September 6–18, 1947. 3: 289–296. Pdf version.
- Marschak, Jacob (May 1949). "Role of liquidity under complete and incomplete information". The American Economic Review, Papers and Proceedings of the Sixty-first Annual Meeting of the American Economic Association. 39 (3). The American Economic Association: 182–195. JSTOR 1831743.
- Marschak, Jacob; Arrow, Kenneth J.; Harris, Theodore (July 1951). "Optimal inventory policy". Econometrica. 19 (3): 250–272. doi:10.2307/1906813. JSTOR 1906813.
- Marschak, Jacob (January 1955). "Elements for a theory of teams". Management Science. 1 (2): 127–137. doi:10.1287/mnsc.1.2.127.
- Marschak, Jacob; Block, H.D. (1960). "An identity in arithmetic". Bulletin of the American Mathematical Society. 65 (3): 123–124. doi:10.1090/S0002-9904-1959-10287-1.
- Marschak, Jacob (May 1960). "Theory of an efficient several-person firm". The American Economic Review, Papers and Proceedings of the Seventy-second Annual Meeting of the American Economic Association. 50 (2). American Economic Association: 541–548. JSTOR 1815057.
- Marschak, Jacob (May 1968). "Economics of inquiring, communicating, deciding". The American Economic Review, Papers and Proceedings of the Eightieth Annual Meeting of the American Economic Association. 58 (2). American Economic Association: 1–18. JSTOR 1831792.
- Marschak, Jacob (1974a). "Rational Behavior, Uncertain Prospects, and Measurable Utility (1950)". Economic Information, Decision, and Prediction: Selected Essays: Volume I Part I Economics of Decision. Vol. 7. Springer. pp. 5–39. doi:10.1007/978-94-010-9276-0_2. ISBN 978-90-277-1195-3.
- Marschak, Jacob (1974b). "Efficient and Viable Organizational Forms (1959)". Economic Information, Decision, and Prediction: Selected Essays: Volume II Part II Economics of Decision. Vol. 7. Springer. pp. 77–90. doi:10.1007/978-94-010-9278-4_5. ISBN 978-90-277-1196-0.
- Marschak, Jacob (1974c). "The Rationale of the Demand for Money and of 'Money Illusion'". Economic Information, Decision, and Prediction: Selected Essays: Volume III Part III Economics of Decision. Vol. 7. Springer. pp. 95–130. doi:10.1007/978-94-010-9280-7_6. ISBN 978-90-277-1197-7.

== Honours ==
- 1946 President of the Econometric Society
- 1963 Honorary Fellow of the Royal Statistical Society
- 1967 Distinguished Fellow of the American Economic Association
