= Catholic University College, Kensington =

The Catholic University College was a short-lived nineteenth-century institution in Kensington, London.

On 21 November 1873, Henry Edward Manning, Archbishop of Westminster, announced that the Roman Catholic Bishops had agreed to form a College of Higher Studies for Catholics. The College was established to provide higher education to Catholics who were forbidden by papal decree to attend the Universities of Oxford and Cambridge. The College was established at Abingdon House in Kensington which was adapted by George Goldie, and Monsignor Thomas John Capel was appointed Rector. The Catholic bishops decided that the College should be funded not by special collections in churches, but by donations from the wealthy Catholic families who would benefit from its creation until such time as it would become independently supported by the fees of its students.

Much of the initial cost, however, was placed upon the bishops themselves and many, including William Bernard Ullathorne, Bishop of Birmingham, although agreeing in principle with the idea of the college, objected to having to bear the costs of an institution based in London that they felt would not benefit students in their dioceses. By June 1877 Mgr. Capel was already suggesting to Manning ways of cutting the costs of the College and in a meeting with Daniel Gilbert, the Vicar General of Westminster, on 9 November of that year Capel put forward his own proposals for funding.

By 1878 the College finances were in chaos – Capel was removed from the post of rector and attempts were made to find a successor. On Capel's removal from financial control of the college, Gilbert discovered that it had been run with no account books, despite Capel's assurances that they would be presented to the Low Week meetings of the bishops.

There was some discussion regarding moving the College to the country and selling the land and buildings in London. This would have the advantage of both reducing costs and in the eyes of the bishops improving the moral state of the students. To make matters worse, Capel claimed that running the College had left him heavily in debt and attempted a legal claim against Manning. Eventually the land was sold and the College closed in 1882.

A partial heir of the idea of a Catholic University in London is St Mary's University, Twickenham, a school founded in 1850 that became a (University) College in 1928, a constituent college of the University of London in 1949 and an independent university in 2014.

== Notable people ==
=== Notable alumni ===
- Wilfrid Ward, biographer and ecclesiastical historian

=== Notable faculty ===
- Thomas John Capel: Rector
- Walter Croke Robinson: Censor
- Robert Francis Clarke
- Frederick Settle Barff: chemist and co-inventor of the Bower-Barff Process
- St George Mivart: biologist
- Frederick Apthorp Paley: classicist
- Howel William lloyd
- Charles Stanton Devas

== External References ==
Horwood, Tom "The Rise and Fall of the Catholic University College, Kensington, 1868–1882" Journal of Ecclesiastical History 2003
