= Charles James Jackson =

British businessman and collector (1846–1923)

Sir Charles James Jackson
- Born: 2 May 1846; Monmouth, Wales
- Died: 23 April 1923 (aged 73); London, England
- Resting place: Putney Vale Cemetery
- Occupations: Barrister; businessman
- Known for: Authority on gold and silver plate

Sir Charles James Jackson (2 May 1846 – 23 April 1923) was a British businessman, collector, barrister, newspaper executive, politician, and writer, who was an authority on antique gold and silver plate.

== Biography ==
Jackson was born in Monmouth, the son of James Edward Jackson and his wife, Mary Ann Bass. The Jackson family owned a building company in Monmouth, but in 1860 removed to Cardiff. There, they established a successful business, designing and constructing buildings and investing in commercial property. Charles Jackson described himself as an architect. In 1879 he stood as an independent candidate for Roath ward on Cardiff Borough Council, but was not elected. However, in 1882 he was elected as the Conservative councillor for the Cardiff East ward.

He stood down from the council in 1887, to complete his training as a barrister. In 1888, he was called to the bar at the Middle Temple, and thereafter developed his own practice on the South Wales legal circuit, as well as working on private Parliamentary bills relating to the building industry. After his sister Helen married Henry Lascelles Carr, the owner of the Western Mail who later became the proprietor of the News of the World, Charles Jackson became a director of the newspaper in 1893. In 1901, he moved to London, and lived at Hampstead and later in Knightsbridge. He succeeded Carr as chairman of the News of the World in 1902, and retained the post until his death. He was noted for attending the newspaper's printing each week, and gave tips of half a crown to the production and delivery staff for ensuring that it was printed in time for the night train.

Jackson's investments in the newspaper, and his property holdings, made him a wealthy man, and allowed him to indulge his passion for silver. He gradually built up a large collection, especially of silver spoons, and made extensive studies of silver held by museums and in church and municipal collections. In 1890, he read a paper to the Society of Antiquaries on the history of the spoon, and Queen Victoria allowed her silver-gilt Coronation spoon to be displayed at the meeting. He was elected as a Fellow of the Society of Antiquaries in 1891.

He wrote authoritatively on the history of gold and silver objects. His first book was English Goldsmiths and their Marks, first published in 1905 and later republished several times in updated versions, most recently in 1989 as Jackson's Silver and Gold Marks of England, Scotland and Ireland. The book contains details of each assay office in the country, with their various marks. He also wrote An Illustrated History of English Plate, Ecclesiastical and Secular, published in 1911. His two books are described as "the foundation of modern silver scholarship".

He was influential in establishing the National Museum of Wales, and for helping ensure that it was based in Cardiff. He agreed in 1922 to lend about a quarter of his collection of silver to the museum, which gradually added more of his pieces on loan until, in 1947, it completed the acquisition of his collection, holding it on behalf of the family trust. In 2001, the museum completed the purchase of half of the total collection. The museum describes some of his collection as:

"...of outstanding aesthetic quality. Rare items include an early 14th-century acorn-top spoon, which is one of the first hallmarked pieces of English silver, and a complete set of 'apostle' spoons (twelve apostles and the 'Master') from 1638. The most important item is probably a two-handled cup in the auricular style (a 17th century ornamental style based on parts of the human anatomy, particularly the human ear, after which the style is named) associated with the Dutch silversmith Christian van Vianen, who worked for the court of Charles I....Unusual, inspirational pieces in the collection include one of the earliest known silver wine tasters, a 17th-century Catholic chalice made in Cork that can be taken apart for concealment, and an inkstand in the form of a library globe..."

Sir Charles Jackson was knighted in 1919, for services to the Red Cross during the First World War. He died in 1923, and was buried in Putney Vale Cemetery.

Jackson was married twice, firstly to Agnes Catherine Martin and then to Ada Elizabeth Williams. With his second wife he had three children: Daphne, Vivian, and Derek. Derek Jackson became Professor of Spectroscopy at Oxford University between 1947 and 1957, and was also noted for his flamboyant personal life as a "rampant bisexual" who was married six times.
