= Barbara Skelton =

British writer (1916–1996)

- Born: Barbara Olive Skelton; 26 June 1916; Taplow, Buckinghamshire, England
- Died: 27 January 1996 (aged 79); Worcestershire, England
- Occupations: Novelist; memoirist
- Spouses: Cyril Connolly (m. 1950; div. 1956); George Weidenfeld (m. 1956; div. 1961); Derek Jackson (m. 1966; div. 1966)

Barbara Olive Skelton (26 June 1916 – 27 January 1996) was an English memoirist, novelist and socialite.

== Background ==
Skelton was born at The Croft, Ellington Road, Taplow, Buckinghamshire, elder daughter of Eric George Skelton, who had been a Major in the West India regiment before being invalided out at a young age, and Ada Eveline (née Williams), a theatre Gaiety Girl. Eric Skelton was a descendant of playwright Richard Brinsley Sheridan; his brother was the Army officer and writer Dudley Skelton. Her younger sister, Brenda, was born in 1922. Skelton spent some of her early years in British India; a difficult child, she once charged at her mother with a carving knife and was later expelled from a convent school. As a teenager, she had an affair with a friend of her father's, which led to an abortion.

== Royal mistress ==
In World War II, she was recruited into the Foreign Office as a cipher clerk by Donald Maclean, a diplomat who unknown to her was a Soviet spy. In 1942, she was assigned to the British embassy in Cairo, where at the Auberge des Pyramides night club, she first met King Farouk, who was throwing bread balls at the patrons. In April 1943, Skelton replaced Irene Guinle as Farouk's "official mistress".

Skelton called Farouk "a complete philistine", but also funny and amusing. She stated about Farouk: "He was very adolescent. He didn't have the stuff to be a great king, he was too childish. But he never lost his temper, he was incredibly sweet, with a good sense of humor. He wasn't a grand passion, but I was bored to death with all the British officers I knew in Cairo. Life in the palace with Farouk was not boring". In 1945, the ambassador, Sir Miles Lampson, decided that Skelton was a security risk, believing that she was leaking information to Farouk, and she was reassigned to the embassy in Athens. Of these allegations, Skelton stated: "After all, I was in a sensitive position, and they were convinced that Farouk was settling me up just to get information from me. What they could never understand was that Farouk couldn't have cared less. The only communications to England that mattered to him were his telexes ordering silk neckties from Hawes and Curtis. There was absolutely nothing political about him then". Farouk encouraged Skelton to run up a large bill with dressmakers, promising her he would pay for it all, which he did not when she informed him that she was being reassigned to Athens, leading her to say he was "staggering cheap".

Later years found her in Yugoslavia, Egypt, the United States, Cuba and back in England. She lived for many years in France before returning to England where she died in 1996.

== Writings ==
Her works include a volume of short stories, Born Losers (1966), two novels, A Young Girl's Touch (1956) and A Love Match (1969), as well as two volumes of memoirs, Tears Before Bedtime (1987) and Weep No More (1989).

== Personal life ==
She wed prominent critic Cyril Connolly in 1950, a marriage which ended in 1956. At the time of her engagement to Connolly in 1950, King Farouk took his much publicised "bachelor party" in Europe, and invited Skelton to join his entourage as he travelled across Europe. Connolly encouraged his fiancée to go with the king as she recalled: "He thought I could get money from Farouk for pay for our honeymoon. He had no idea how tight this king was".

Despite encouraging his fiancée to go with Farouk, Connolly became consumed with jealousy and started stalking the royal party as Skelton remembered: "Cyril turned out to be more jealous than I first thought." Despite the fact that he was worth $140,000,000 US dollars (a sum equivalent to a billion dollars today), Farouk stole rings belonging to Skelton as she remembered: "One night he asked to see these lovely eternity rings I had for years and years. I never got them back. I'm sure he took them and had them woven into Narriman's famous bejewelled wedding dress". Skelton recalled: "After Biarritz Farouk and his group kept on to Cannes and Cyril and I went to the Dordogne. I was glad to get away, especially from the press. I had become the 'mystery woman'."

She married George Weidenfeld, a publisher, in 1956; that marriage ended in 1961. She met Weidenfeld when he agreed to publish A Young Girl's Touch. Divorce was very difficult to obtain in Britain until 1967, and it was necessary to prove adultery conclusively to the courts to be granted one. In 1956, her marriage to Connolly was ended when evidence of her adultery with Weidenfeld was presented to the court and in 1961 her marriage to Weidenfeld was ended when evidence of her adultery with Connolly was presented to the court.

Her final marriage in 1966 to Derek Jackson, a physicist, was brief. The alimony she obtained from Jackson allowed her to live in Paris in relative comfort. She had affairs with, among others, Peter Quennell, Feliks Topolski, Charles Addams, Bernard Frank, John Sutro and Alan Ross.

Anthony Powell used her as the basis for Pamela Flitton, a character in his novel sequence A Dance to the Music of Time. Powell also wrote a critical essay on Skelton, included in the collection Miscellaneous Verdicts.

== Death ==
She died in Worcestershire from brain cancer, aged 79.

== Sources ==
- Lewis, Jeremy. Cyril Connolly. London: Jonathan Cape, 1997
- Lewis, Jeremy. Grub Street Irregular. London: Harper Press, 2008
- Powell, Anthony. Miscellaneous Verdicts: Writings on Writers, 1946–1989. London: Heineman 1990
- Skelton, Barbara. Tears Before Bedtime. London: Hamish Hamilton, 1987
- Skelton, Barbara. Weep No More. London: Hamish Hamilton, 1989
- Stadiem, William (1991). Too Rich The High Life and Tragic Death of King Farouk. New York: Carroll & Graf.
- Taylor, D. J. (2019). Lost Girls: Love, War and Literature, 1939-1951. London: Constable.
