= Ludwig Lachmann =

German economist (1906–1990)

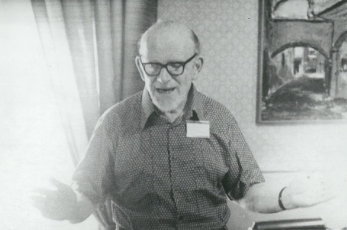
- Born: 1 February 1906; Berlin, German Empire
- Died: 17 December 1990 (aged 84); Johannesburg, South Africa
- Spouse: Margot Lachmann

Academic background
- Influences: Friedrich Hayek; Carl Menger; Max Weber; Ludwig von Mises; G. L. S. Shackle; Alfred Schütz

Academic work
- Discipline: Economics; Economic history
- School or tradition: Austrian School

Ludwig Maurits Lachmann (/ˈlɑːxmɑːn/; German: [ˈlaxman]; 1 February 1906 – 17 December 1990) was a German economist, economic theorist and important contributor to the Austrian School of Economics. Lachmann, Israel Kirzner, and Murray Rothbard were the three primary catalysts of the Austrian 'revival', beginning in 1974. He wrote on economic theory, history, and methodology, as well as on the application of Hermeneutics to economic thought, in order to interpret economic phenomena.

== Life ==
=== Early life ===
Ludwig Lachmann was born in Berlin, Germany on 1 February 1906 into a Jewish middle-class family. His father was a metal manufacturer, and his mother came from an intellectual background and had a strong influence on young Ludwig. His mother's brother, a bank official, also had a strong influence upon his nephew's early intellectual development. Ludwig was an only child, and initially was educated by his mother, but was later enrolled in Askanisches High School. His childhood years are generally described as happy, which would contrast with his later life in Germany, surrounded by constant political and economic instability and crisis.

=== Education and 'pre-revival' career ===
Lachmann enrolled at the University of Berlin in 1924, studying under, among others, Werner Sombart, who introduced Lachmann to the works of Weber, that had a lifelong influence on Lachmann's work. He took a semester at the University of Zurich in 1926, and around the same time, he was introduced into the works of Ludwig von Mises and Friedrich Hayek. He graduated in 1930, and spent a few years to teach at the university. When Adolf Hitler rose to power in 1933, Lachmann moved to England with his girlfriend Margot. The couple struggled financially, and Lachmann, unable to find a post in an academic position, enrolled at the London School of Economics. At the London School of Economics he was a student and later colleague of Friedrich Hayek. One of Lachmann's fellow students was George Shackle, whose ideas would influence Lachmann's later work. He deepened his interest in the Austrian School, and was one of the few who chose Hayek's side, though not uncritically, following the so-called 'Keynesian Revolution'. In 1938, Lachmann was awarded the Leon Fellowship from the University of London to study 'secondary depressions'. In this research project, he traveled to the United States, where he met Alfred Schütz and Frank Knight, and attended the seminars of the latter. Following the outbreak of war in Europe, Lachmann, a German national, was interned by British authorities from July to December 1940. In 1941, following his release, he was appointed as an economic lecturer at the University of London. In 1943, he was appointed to the Head of the Department of Economics at the University of Hull, a position he held until he departed from England in 1948.

In 1948, Lachmann moved to Johannesburg, South Africa, where he accepted a professorship at the University of the Witwatersrand. During this time, he published his seminal work, Capital and Its Structure in 1956. He served as president of the Economic Society of South Africa from 1962 to 1963. He remained teaching at Witwatersrand until retiring in 1972.

=== Austrian 'revival', 1974–1987 and death ===
In 1974, a conference on Austrian economics was organized in South Royalton, Vermont, in which Lachmann was a key speaker, along with Israel Kirzner and Murray Rothbard. This conference led to the publication of the 1976 book, The Foundations of Modern Austrian Economics, to which Lachmann contributed. Following the conference, Lachmann began annual trips to New York City, where he worked with Kirzner at NYU, advancing research and lecturing to students. Lachmann also was engaged in an economic debate with Kirzner regarding notions of equilibrium, and the role of the entrepreneur Lachmann continued this work from 1975 to 1987, when he re-retired to Johannesburg. Lachmann died on 17 December 1990. To commemorate Lachmann, his widow established a trust to fund the Ludwig M. Lachmann Research Fellowship at the Department of Philosophy, Logic and Scientific Method of the London School of Economics.

=== Personal life ===
Lachmann met his future wife, Margot Wulff, in the late 20's at an Italian language class. They ran into each other again in Sankt Moritz, and began a relationship. When their financial situation became secure, the couple got married in England, in 1939. Their marriage was described as, "a successful match," by Ludwig's former colleague, Karl Mittermaier.

Lachmann himself has been described as "a very unusual man" and an "old world European gentleman" and one with a personality that left a lasting impression on those who knew him. He was described as "unfailingly gracious and considerate". He was also described as both intentionally and unintentionally humorous.

== On economics ==
Lachmann grew to believe that the Austrian School had deviated from Carl Menger's original vision of an entirely subjective economics. To Lachmann, Austrian Theory was an evolutionary, or "genetic-causal" approach, as opposed to the equilibrium and perfect-knowledge models used in mainstream neoclassical economics. He was a strong advocate of using hermeneutic methods in the study of economic phenomena. Lachmann's "fundamentalist Austrianism" was rare as few living Austrian economists departed from the mainstream. He underscored what he viewed as distinctive from that mainstream: economic subjectivism, imperfect knowledge, the heterogeneity of capital, the business cycle, methodological individualism, alternative cost and "market process". His brand of Austrianism now forms the basis for the "radical subjectivist" strand of Austrian Economics. His work influenced later American developments of the Austrian School. Fellow Austrian Economist Israel Kirzner was a close friend of Lachmann's whom he aligned with intellectually (though they disagreed on some finer details).

== Contemporary social science research ==
Lachmann's ideas continue to influence contemporary social science research. Many social scientific disciplines explicitly or implicitly build on the subjective theory of value, developed by Carl Menger and the Austrian School of Economics.

== Selected bibliography ==
- The Role of Expectations in Economics as a Social Science, 1943
- Capital and Its Structure, 1956
- From Mises to Shackle: an essay on Austrian economics and the Kaleidic society, 1976
- The Market as an Economic Process, 1986
- Austrian Economics: a hermeneutic approach, 1990

== See also ==
- Kaleidics
- Austrian School
- Post-Keynesian School
