= Dudley Skelton =

British general, author, and physician (1878–1962)

Major-General Dudley Skelton CB DSO
- Born: 8 August 1878
- Died: 2 March 1962 (aged 83)
- Allegiance: United Kingdom
- Branch: British Army
- Service years: 1902–1937
- Rank: Major-General
- Conflicts: First World War
- Awards: Companion of the Order of the Bath, Companion of the Distinguished Service Order, Mentioned in Dispatches

Major-General Dudley Sheridan Skelton, CB, DSO (8 August 1878 - 2 March 1962) was a British Army officer, author and physician.

Skelton was educated at Bloxham School. He commissioned into the British Army as a probationary lieutenant in the Royal Army Medical Corps on 1 September 1902. Skelton served in the First World War and was awarded the Distinguished Service Order. He was promoted to brevet lieutenant-colonel in August 1917. He was promoted to colonel in 1930. In 1935 he became Honorary Surgeon to George V. He was invested as a Companion of the Order of the Bath in the 1936 Birthday Honours, while serving as Deputy Director of Medical Services, Southern Command, India. He retired as a major-general on 13 October 1937.

Skelton was a descendant of the playwright Richard Brinsley Sheridan. His niece was the writer Barbara Skelton.

== Publications ==
- By Motor Through Ceylon (1903)
- This Amazing India (1904)
