= Skeleton Creek (Queensland) =

Coordinates: 16.9783°S 145.7725°E

Skeleton Creek is a watercourse in Queensland, Australia. It is near Woree and White Rock in the south suburbs of Cairns.
