= Skelton, Indiana =

- Extinct town
- Location within Indiana Location within the United States
- Coordinates: 38°20′29″N 87°46′54″W
- Country: United States
- State: Indiana
- County: Gibson
- Township: Montgomery
- Elevation: 390 ft (120 m)
- ZIP code: 47665
- FIPS code: 18-69984
- GNIS feature ID: 443570

Skelton is a ghost town community in Montgomery Township, Gibson County, Indiana. The town would be completely inside the grounds of the Gibson Generating Station if it existed still. No part of the town exists as most of what was Skelton is in Gibson Lake.

Skelton was laid out in 1911.

== Geography ==
Skelton is located at 38°20′29″N 87°46′54″W.
