= Skilton =

Skilton may refer to:

- Avery Judd Skilton (1802–1858), American physician and naturalist
- Bob Skilton (born 1938), Australian rules football player who played as a rover for South Melbourne and Victoria
- Charles Sanford Skilton (1868–1941), American composer, teacher and musicologist
- Chris Skilton (born 1955), Archdeacon of London
- Edward Skilton (1863–1917), British sport shooter who competed in the 1912 Summer Olympics
- Emmett Skilton (born 1987), New Zealand based actor
- Raymie Skilton (1889–1961), American professional ice hockey defenseman

== See also ==
- Bob Skilton Medal, awarded to the Sydney Swans player adjudged the Best and Fairest over the home and away season
- Skilton Ledge, relatively flat rectangular rock platform at the southeast margin of Midnight Plateau, Darwin Mountains
