= Margaret Plues =

English botanist

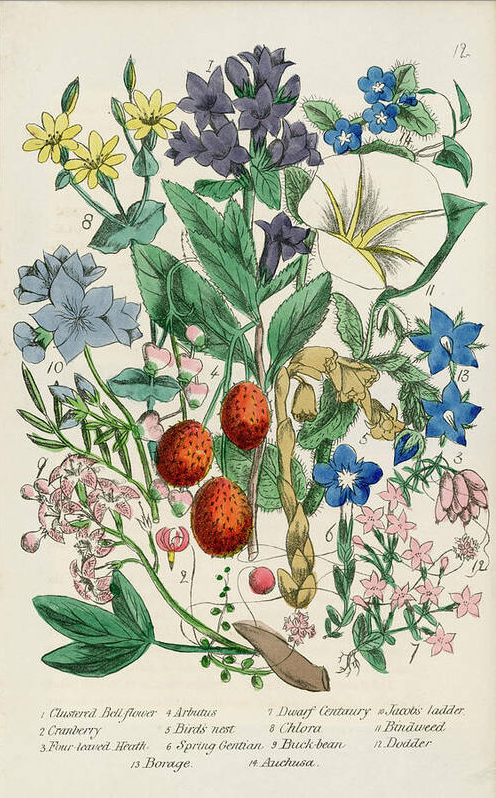
illustration from Rambles in search of wild flowers and how to distinguish them by Margaret Plues 1864

Margaret Mary Plues (ca. 1840 – 1903) was a British botanist and writer known primarily for her popularizing botanical books, especially those on the ferns and grasses of Great Britain. She also wrote under the pseudonym Skelton Yorke. She spent the latter part of her life working with Catholic establishments providing relief to the poor.

== Biography ==
Margaret Mary Plues was born in Ripon, Yorkshire, to the Rev. William Plues and Hannah (Swire) Plues. She had at least seven siblings, and she lived much of her adult life with one or another of them.

In her early twenties, she published books for the general public on her botanical collecting trips, with titles beginning Rambles in Search of.... Plues was writing in an era when books popularizing science were taking off as a genre, and her work compares to that being done by such authors as Phoebe Lankester and Elizabeth and Mary Kirby.

Plues later wrote more scientific volumes on British ferns and grasses that covered such topics as geographic distribution, structure, propagation and cultivation, and diseases.

She also published some novels and stories, most of them under the pseudonym, "Skelton Yorke".

In 1866, she converted to Roman Catholicism, and in the 1870s, she moved to London, where she was put in charge of a workhouse recently founded by Monsignor Thomas John Capel. Bad with finances, he borrowed from Plues, thereby ruining her when he himself went bankrupt. By 1885, Plues was in charge of a women's home elsewhere in London. By 1891, she had moved to Surrey to live with one of her brothers. She entered a convent, St Maur's, in Weybridge sometime after this, where she rose to be the Superior General (the head, usually addressed as mother-superior).

== Selected books ==
=== As Margaret Plues ===
- Rambles in Search of Ferns (1861)
- Rambles in Search of Mosses (1861)
- Rambles in Search of Wild Flowers (1863)
- Geology for the Millions (1863, with Edward Wood)
- Rambles in Search of Flowerless Plants (1864)
- British Ferns: An Introduction to the Ferns, Lycopods, and Equiseta Indigenous to the British Isles (1866)
- A Selection of Eatable Funguses of Great Britain (1866)
- British Grasses: An Introduction to the Study of the Gramineae of Great Britain and Ireland (1867)
- Jessie's Holiday; or, Six Months at Throstle's Nest (1879)

=== As Skelton Yorke ===
- Hilda, or the Old Seat of Council (1868)
- Aunt Margaret's Little Neighbours; or, Chats About the Rosary (1872; story collection)
- Noel; or, It Was to Be (1865, with Robert Baker)
