= Frederick S. Barff =

English chemist

Frederick Settle Barff (6 October 1822 (Note: 1823 in his obituary.) – 11 August 1886) was an English chemist, ecclesiastical decorator, and stained glass manufacturer, much interested in theology.

He is best known as a chemist, having invented several important preservation methods for a range of materials, including iron, stone, wood and foodstuffs. Several of his stained glass windows still survive throughout Ireland and the north of England.

A portrait photograph of Barff appears in The History of St Stanislaus College, Beaumont, published in 1911.

== Early life ==
Born in Hackney, London, the son of a doctor, Barff was educated at Christ's College, Cambridge, where he earned a BA in 1844, followed by an MA in 1847. After graduating, he was ordained at Peterborough and started work as an Anglican curate in Hull. He also served as curate of St Nicholas' Church, Leicester, before, in 1852, converting to Catholicism.

== Ecclesiastical decorator ==
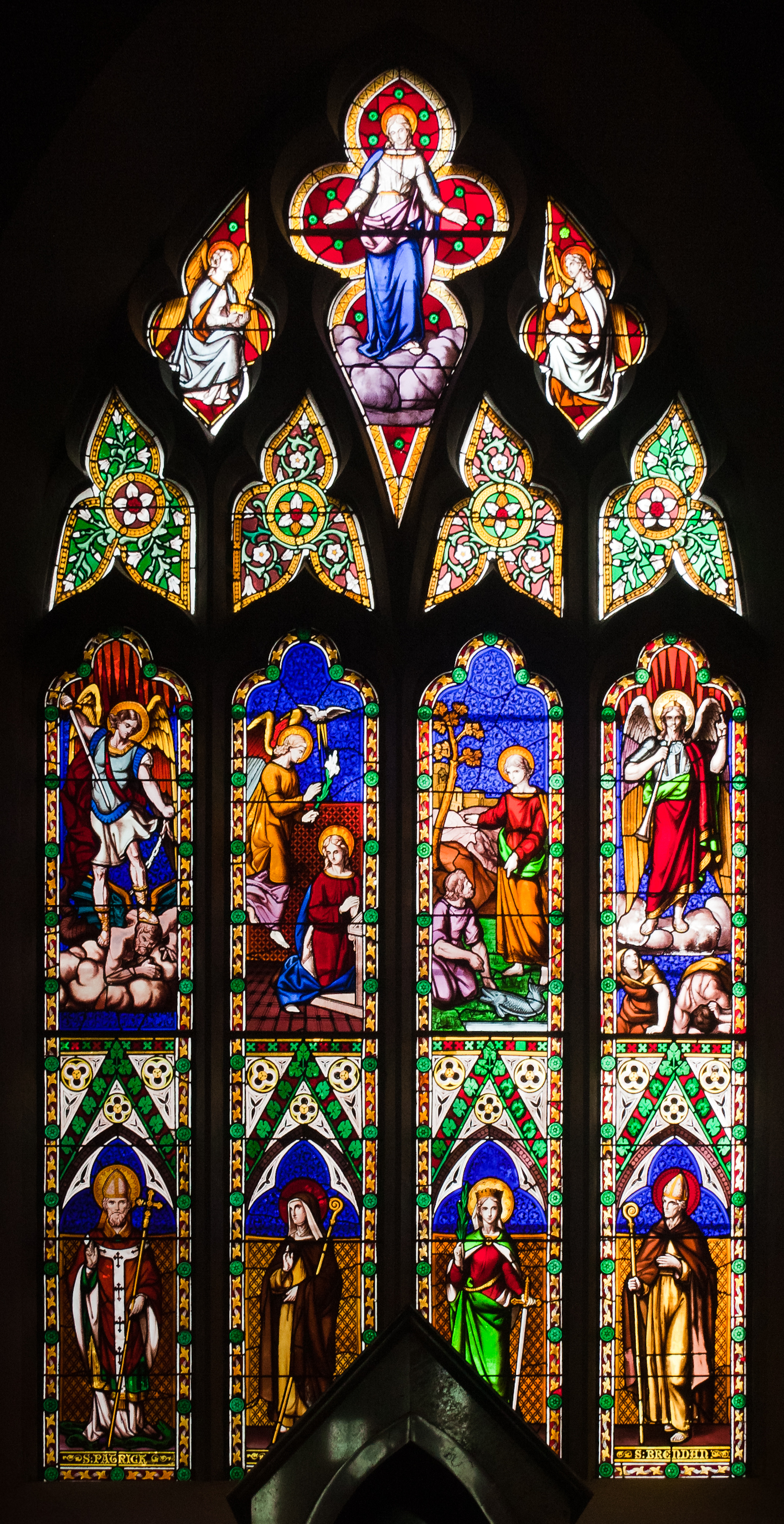
Stained Glass Window, St Michael's Church, Ballinasloe

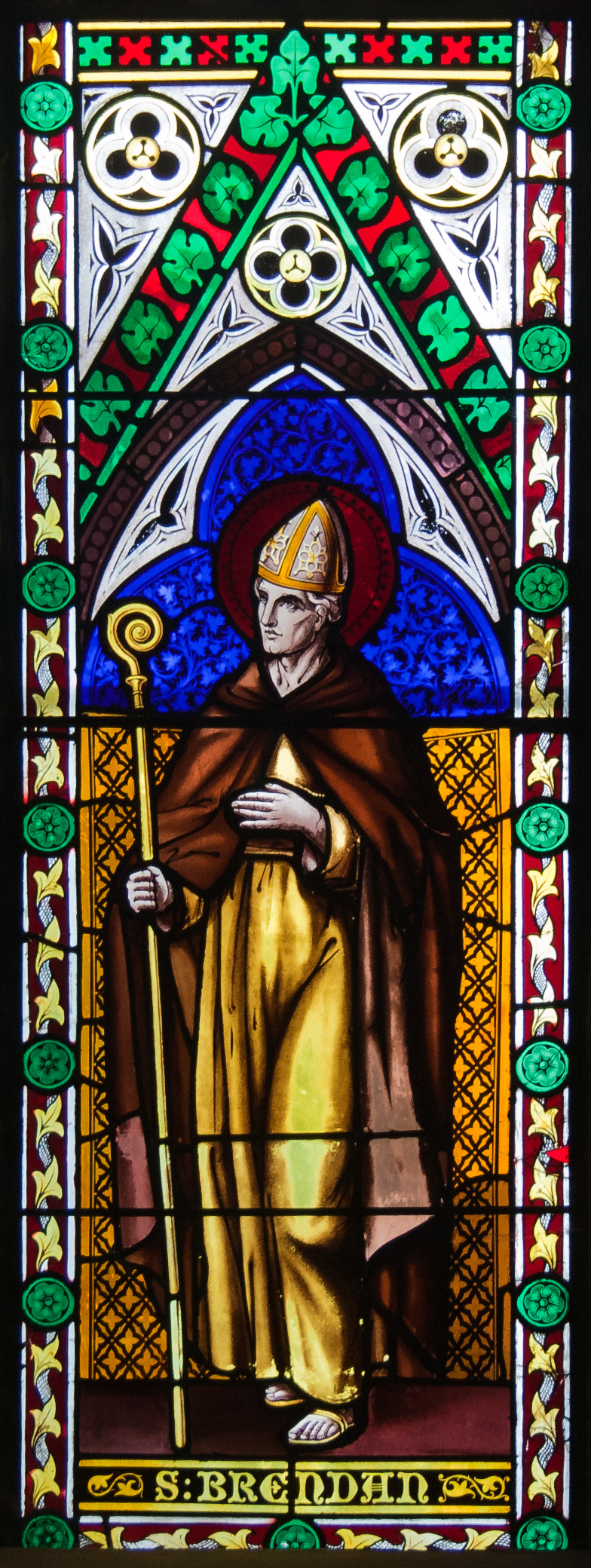
Detail (St Brendan) Stained Glass Window, St Michael's Church

By the mid-1850s, Barff established Mssrs. F.S. Barff & Co., an ecclesiastical decorating company, in Liverpool.

=== North England ===
He supervised the interior decoration of St Patrick's Church, Liverpool and painted the frescoes at Stonyhurst College. The firm also decorated the churches of St Wilfrid's, Preston and St Mary's, Chelsea. (Note: The Tablet, 13 October 1854(or 1855), 647 quoted in Irish Architectural Archive)

=== Ireland ===
By 1858 Barff's company had moved to Dublin, possibly influenced by his contemporary and fellow convert John Hungerford Pollen, where most of the work was undertaken for Catholic churches.

Works executed in Ireland:

Location	Building	Date	Works
St Johnstown	St Baithen's Church	1860	Stained glass, high altar and side altar
Gargary	St Patrick's Church	1860ca	Altar and tabernacle.
Newtowncunningham	Church	1860ca	Stained glass in chancel and W gable
Letterkenny	Loreto Convent	1861	Stained-glass window in chapel.
Glenvar	Church of St Mary Star of the Sea	1862	Altar and reredos panels filled with enamel work
Galway	Congretational Church	1862	Stained glass window
Monaghan	St Patrick's Church	1862	Lord Rossmore testimonial window. (Note: To a design chosen in competition.)
Dublin	St Catherine's Church	1862	High altar window, stereochromic painting
Dublin	St Paul's Church	1862–1863	Decoration
Dublin	St Patrick's Cathedral	1862 & 1863	Ascension window in S. transept, 1862. (Note: Not executed) Window in N transept. Celtic Revival clerestory windows, 1863.
Mullagh	Church	1862ca	Caen stone altar.
Dublin	Shop(?) No. 93–94, Ryan Bros	1863	Decoration.
Ballinasloe	St Michael's Church (Note: As illustrated.)	?	Stained glass window in apse.
Carlow	St Patrick's College	1858ca	Chapel decoration
Dublin	St Mary's Pro-Cathedral	?	Decoration
Ardcath	St Mary's Church	?	High altar.

During this period, Barff gave a lecture on Decorative Art to the Dublin Mechanics Institute (Note: Presented in 1860.) and successfully patented several processes associated with his work, one of which won honourable mention during the 1862 International Exhibition.

=== Patents ===
Date	Application
Oct. 1860	Improvements in the production of artificial stone, which improvements are also applicable to the preservation of stone, bricks, tiles, and other analogous substances and materials.
Oct. 1860	An improved self-acting apparatus for extinguishing candles in lamps or otherwise.
July 1861	A new or improved process for the induration and preservation of stone and other analogous absorbent substances or materials, which process is also applicable for the production of artificial stone.
June 1863	An improved means of protecting, preserving, and hardening surfaces of brick, cement, stone, stucco, and other analogous substances, which invention is also applicable to the preservation of timber.

The company continued to operate until 1864, when it went bankrupt, at which time Barff returned to England.

== Chemist ==
=== Teaching ===
On his return, Barff became a teacher at Beaumont College, a Jesuit school in Windsor, before moving to University College, London as assistant professor of chemistry. He later became professor of chemistry at the Royal Academy of Arts for eight years and also at the Catholic University College, Kensington, a position for which he was nominated by Cardinal Manning, as well as at the Beaumont College.

He was made a Fellow of the Chemical Society in 1867.

Barff acted as Examiner in Chemistry for the Natural science tripos at Cambridge University, a role he was first awarded in 1873.

=== Society of Arts lectures ===
Barff delivered three series of Cantor Lectures to the Society of Arts: in 1870, on artistic colours and pigments; in 1872, on the treatment of carbon compounds for heating and lighting purposes; and a further series on Silicates, Silicides, Glass, and Glass Painting.

He also delivered the juvenile lectures, for 1878, on the subject of Coal and its Compounds.

Barff was awarded two Art Society's medals: one for a paper on Zinc White as Paint, and the Treatment of Iron for the Prevention of Corrosion and the other for his paper on A New Antiseptic Compound, the latter of which he presented to the society in March 1882.

=== Published works ===
- An Introduction to scientific chemistry, 1869.
- An introduction to scientific chemistry: designed for the use of schools, 1869
- Elementary chemistry, 1875.

=== Society of Arts publications ===
- On silicates, silicides, glass and glass painting, 1872
- Carbon & certain compounds of carbon, treated principally in reference to heating and illuminating purposes 1874
- The treatment of iron for the prevention of corrosion, 1877

=== Design and inventions ===
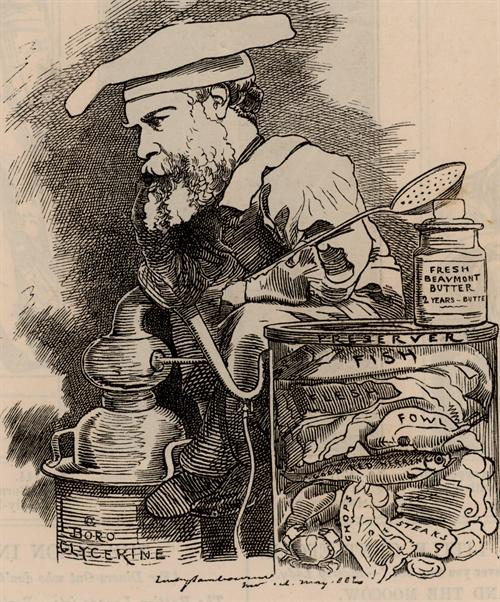
Caricature of Barff published in Punch, 1882. Caption: Member for Boro-Glyceride. Our Preserver!

Barff is most widely remembered for his invention of a method of rust proofing cast iron, named after him. The method used superheated steam to form a layer of tri-iron tetroxide(Fe_{3}O_{4}), which proved much cheaper than traditional galvanisation. The method was subsequently improved by George Bower, after which the process became known as the Bower–Barff process. The Bower-Barff Rustless Iron Co. had works in Southwark and New York, the latter supplying cast-iron for many of the city's landmark buildings.

He also created an antiseptic compound, Boro glycerine, primarily for the preservation of meats but which subsequently found many medical uses. It is still used in some parts of the world as an oral antiseptic in the treatment of mouth ulcers. A caricature of Barff, contemplating a barrel of boro glycerine, appeared in an 1882 edition of Punch as No.84 of the Fancy Portraits series.

Barff was an early exponent of the use of hydrocarbons as fuel, starting Sim & Barff's Patent Mineral Oil Steam Fuel Company, for the purpose of developing heating, power and lighting systems which could operate on liquid hydrocarbons. At a time when experiments in the field appeared to show little promise of success, Barff believed that

...these oils are doubtless destined to form the marine steam fuel of the future.

Barff's design experiments to remove noxious elements from the exhaust products of combustion in locomotives and similar furnaces, a precursor to the catalytic converter, were met with some ridicule as the weight of reagents needed were almost equal to the weight of fuel burned.

=== Patents ===
Date	Application
October 1869	A method by which the products of combustion evolved from locomotive engines and other furnaces (are) passed through vessels containing chemical reagents, the object being to fix the sulphurous acid and carbonic acid forming part of the gaseous products by causing them to form non-volatile compounds.
1876	A process by which iron is preserved from rusting (forerunner to the Bower–Barff process)

== Death ==
Barff died of complications associated with diabetes at Buckingham, and was buried with his wife Margaretta in Kensal Green Cemetery.
