= Church of St Michael the Greater, Stamford =

Church in Lincolnshire, England

Coordinates: 52.6525°N 0.4778°W

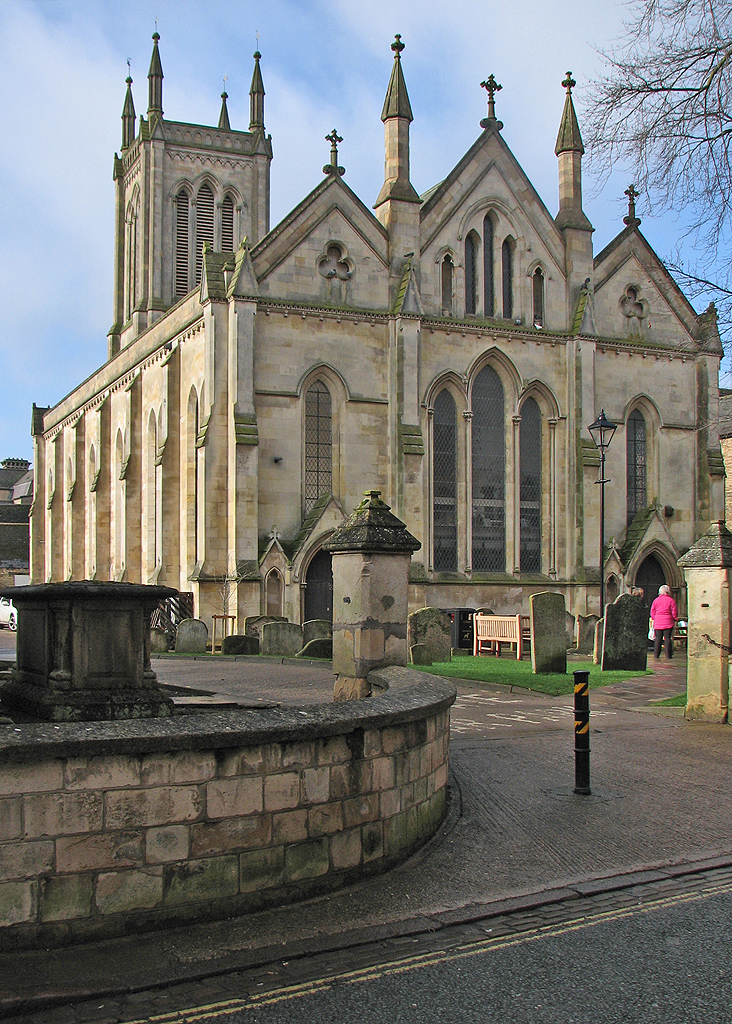
East end of St Michael's Church

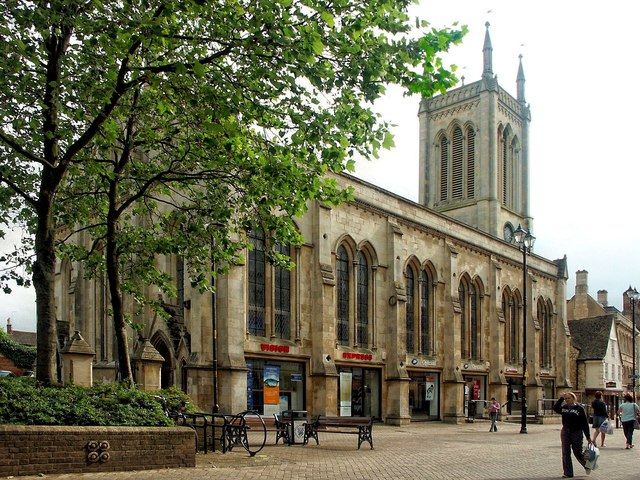
The former church, showing the shop units along the High Street

The Church of St Michael the Greater is a late-Georgian Gothic church in Stamford, Lincolnshire, which stands on the south side of Stamford High Street on the site of a Medieval predecessor. The church is a Grade II listed building as, separately, is the churchyard wall. The building has been converted for commercial use.

It was called St Michael the Greater to distinguish it from ‘St Michael in Cornstall’, a church elsewhere in Stamford.

== History as a church ==
The site, in the heart of the Medieval town, suggests an early, perhaps pre-Norman, date for the foundation of the church but it is not until the middle of the twelfth century that it appears amongst property owned by Crowland Abbey. It is possible St Michael's was founded by Crowland. The Medieval church comprised a nave with north and south aisles and a chancel with north and south chapels and was a frequent meeting place of ecclesiastical courts and corporation meetings. It was extensively altered in the fifteenth century and again in the seventeenth at which time its western tower was made of wood, until 1761 when replaced in stone. The church survived until 1832 when it collapsed after the Rector, the Rev. Charles Swan, removed a number of internal pillars from the nave apparently for aesthetic reasons.

The current building, designed by John Brown of Norwich, was built in Ketton stone over 1835-6 largely on all fours with the earlier church, in Early English style. It was based on the style of the Lady Chapel of Salisbury Cathedral and greatly applauded by the Stamford Mercury at the time. It had a square west tower, iron railings around the perimeter of the site, substantial interior galleries “and elaborate pewing”. The contractors were Woolston and Collins. The building's original estimated cost, in 1834, was £2,800, while the final, total cost by the time of opening, in 1836, was £4,000. Of the Medieval building, “no more than two re-used possibly thirteenth century stiff-leaf capitals [survive] in an undercroft beneath the west tower”.

John Clare Billing (1866–1955) wrote: “The church ... has received harsh criticism from architect and antiquary. The interior, they assert, is unecclesiastical in character and of concert-hall design." Billing noted that the churchyard was smaller until cottages between the King’s Head Inn and High Street were pulled down. He remembered, as a boy, seeing sheep grazing among the gravestones.

== Decommission and conversion ==
The church was declared redundant in 1963 under a pastoral reorganisation of Stamford parishes. After years of vacillation when several options, including demolition, were considered; it was developed into shops in 1982. The conversion, by Arthur Mull Associates of Huntingdon was described by Nikolaus Pevsner as “an unsympathetic use and an appalling conversion”. The interior was gutted and divided, and its Georgian plasterwork and stained-glass windows destroyed. The fifteenth-century octagonal font was dispatched to St Nicholas Church, Leicester, and six eighteenth-century bells to St Mary's Church, Knighton, Leicester. Church plate, including a pair of seventeenth-century silver flagons, was apparently dispersed. The organ, built by J. W. Walker & Sons Ltd in 1863, was dispersed to St Mark's, Killylea, Co. Armagh in 1967.

Six plate-glass shop windows were introduced into the north wall, the three two-bay shop units extend to the ‘rear’ of the building on the ground floor while the remainder is used for storage. A car-park and delivery area were introduced at the rear, flattening much of the Medieval churchyard, although a number of fine eighteenth- and nineteenth-century tombstones and memorials, and, in particular, a late-seventeenth-century chest tomb, survive. Even so, what little remains has also been threatened with development every few years, and a number of proposals made to build shop units upon it.

The churchyard remains in the care of South Kesteven District Council. A Holocaust memorial was added in the twenty-first century. In 2016 gates bearing the Stamford coat of arms were commissioned.

== Gallery ==
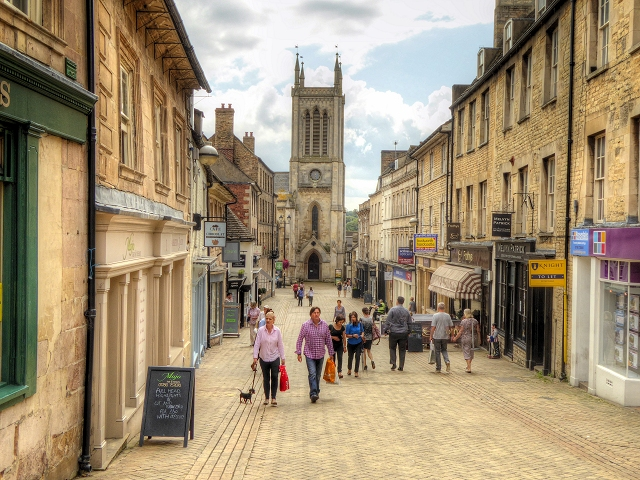
The church tower at the bottom of Ironmonger Street

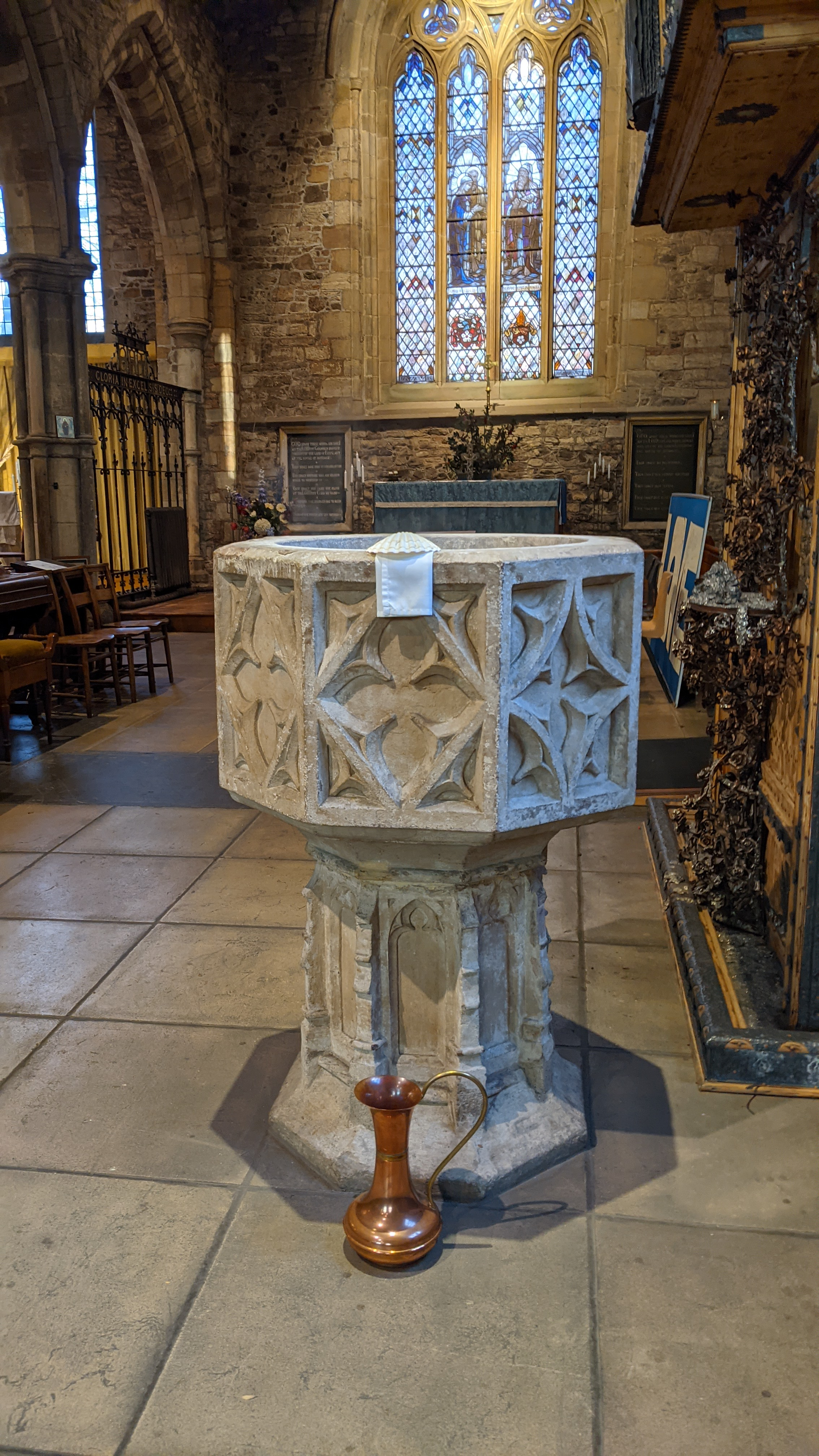
The font, now in St Nicholas Church, Leicester
