= Bower–Barff process =

In metallurgy, the Bower–Barff process is a method of coating iron or steel with magnetic iron oxide, such as Fe_{2}O_{4}, in order to minimize atmospheric corrosion.

The articles to be treated are put into a closed retort and a current of superheated steam passed through for twenty minutes followed by a current of producer gas (carbon monoxide), to reduce any higher oxides that may have been formed.

The process is named for George Bower and Frederick S. Barff.
