= George Bower (ironfounder) =

19th-century English businesspeople (1827–1911)

George Bower (1827-1911)
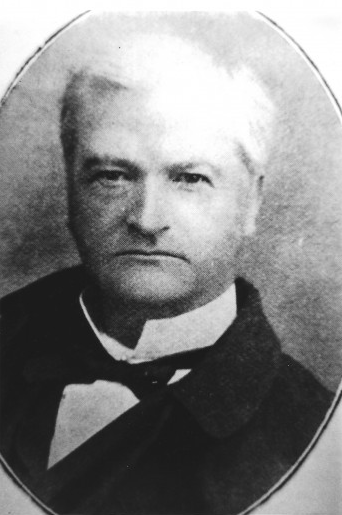
- George Bower, c1880
- Born: 1827; Either Caistor or Carlton-le-Moorland, Lincolnshire
- Died: 29 November 1911 (aged 83–84)
- Occupations: Inventor, Foundry owner and Gas Equipment Manufacturer.
- Known for: Bower–Barff process

George Bower (1827–1911), was the owner of the Vulcan Iron Works, St. Neots, Cambridgeshire and was a leading English manufacturer of equipment for gasworks. He is also described as a waterworks engineer, and manufacturer of gas stoves and stationary steam engines. In 1855 he patented the National Gas Apparatus. This was intended for sale to Country Houses and factories. By 1856 Bower started to concentrate on larger schemes for providing gasworks and established the Provincial Gaslight and Coke Company. In 1862 he patented George Bower's Bye-Pass Valves and Governor for Gas Works He also worked on the development with Frederick Barth on the Bower–Barff process for the oxidisation of cast iron to form a rustless surface. This process is still widely used to-day.

Initially Bower was very successful with the construction of larger gasworks, but he lost money on a large scheme to provide gas lighting for Rio de Janeiro and in 1889 he was declared bankrupt, but he appears to have come to an agreement with his creditors and continued to operate the Vulcan Iron Works with his son Anthony Bower.

He died on 29 November 1911 at the age of 85. A newspaper obituary said, "He installed gas and water works in all poarts of the world, and was the inventor of many improvements in connexion with gas lighting.

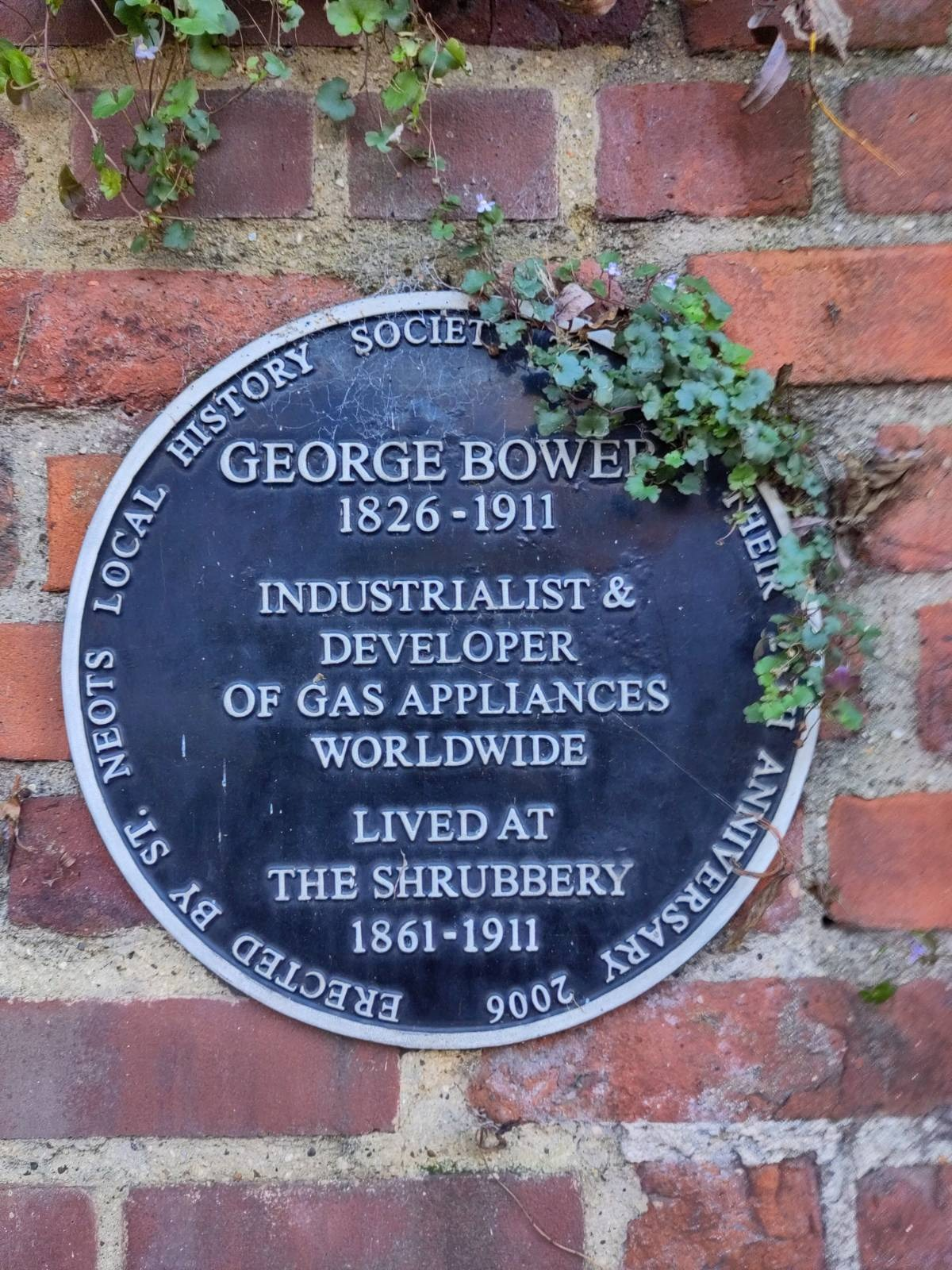
Plaque for George Bower in St Neots
