= Boro glycerine =

Boro-glycerine is a transparent yellow, tasteless, compound of boric acid and glycerine. It is a powerful antiseptic and is used primarily in oral and dental applications. Historically, it was also used in the preservation of food.

== Discovery ==
At a meeting of the Society of Arts, on March 29, 1882, Professor Barff delivered a lecture, in which he announced his discovery of boro-glycerine. Barff had been attempting to find a way in which boric acid, a known antiseptic, could be used to preserve meats, at a time when beef prices were considered high. He hoped to find a suitable alternative to freezing, which would allow cheap imports to be obtained from around the world.

== Uses ==
=== Food preservation ===
As early as 1883, scientific reports recommended boro-glycerine as a safe, suitable preservative for a range of foods, including meat, oysters, milk, and butter. Various experiments, including shipping meats dipped in a boro-glycerine solution on long sea voyages, proved Barff's technique.

=== Historical medical ===
The discovery of a safe means to apply boric acid drew much attention within the medical profession, and by 1835 various experiments, relying on the antiseptic properties of boro-glycerine, were being carried out. Ailments ranged from psoriasis, and other scaly conditions of the skin, to chilblains, and the search for a treatment for cancer of the uterus.

Boro-glycerine found its way into many "medicinal" products, including shaving creams, in which it was considered a skin conditioner, and applied directly as a lip balm

=== Oral and dental ===
Boro-glycerine proved most effective as an oral and dental antiseptic. In particular, it is effective in the treatment of mouth ulcers, stomatitis, and glossitis. It is also frequently used as a wash for the care of the mouth in unconscious patients. It comprises 88% glycerin and 12% borax. Finely ground borax is dissolved in glycerin, and the solution is ready for use (Ref. IP 66).

Boro-glycerine can also be used as a suitable base in controlling the setting time of Zinc Oxide pastes whilst taking a dental impression.

=== Other medical ===
Boro-glycerine, in solution, is used in the treatment of conjunctivitis, earache, and ear infections, and is a suitable antiseptic lotion in cases of ophthalmia, and diphtheria.

=== Various ===
Alfred P. Wire recommended boro-glycerine as a mounting medium in the preparation of microscope slides.
