= Stow Minster =

Coordinates: 53°19′39″N 0°40′38″W

- Minster Church of St Mary, Stow in Lindsey
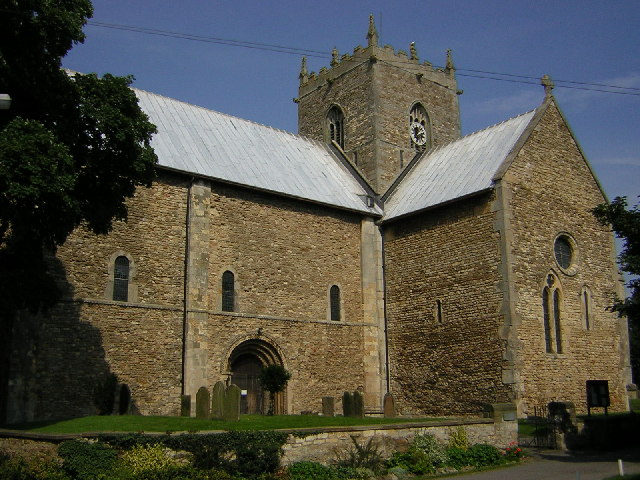
- Stow Minster

- Location within Lincolnshire
- Denomination: Church of England
- Previous denomination: Roman Catholic
- Website: www.stowminster.co.uk

Architecture
- Functional status: Active
- Heritage designation: Grade I listed building

Administration
- Diocese: Diocese of Lincoln
- Deanery: Deanery of Corringham
- Parish: Stow in Lindsey

The Minster Church of St Mary, Stow in Lindsey, is a major Anglo-Saxon church in Lincolnshire and is one of the largest and oldest parish church buildings in England. It has been claimed that the Minster originally served as the cathedral church of the diocese of Lindsey, founded in the 7th century and is sometimes referred to as the "Mother Church of Lincolnshire".

It is partly Anglo-Saxon and partly Norman in date and is designated by Historic England as a Grade I listed building and was also included in the World Monuments Fund's 2006 list of the world's 100 most endangered sites. It has the tallest Anglo-Saxon arches of its time in Britain, the earliest known example of Viking graffiti in England (a rough scratching of an oared Viking sailing ship, probably dating from the 10th century), an Early English font standing on nine supports and an early wall painting of the murder of Thomas Becket.

Today it is part of the Stow Group of Churches.

== History ==
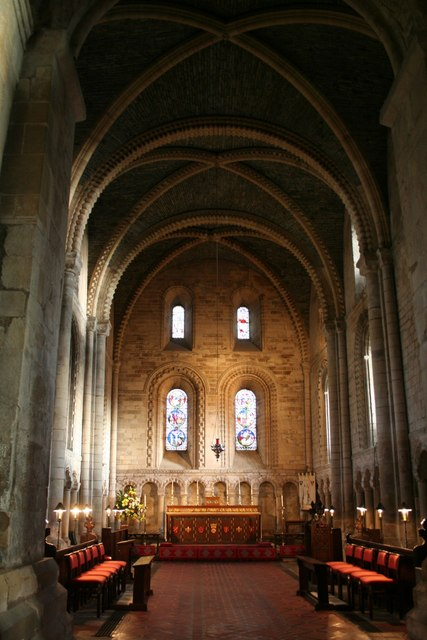
The chancel of St Mary's

The bishop's seat at Sidnacester (Syddensis) has been placed, by various commentators, at Caistor, Louth, Horncastle and, most often, at Stow, all in present-day Lincolnshire, England, but the location remains unknown. More recently Lincoln has been suggested as a possible site.

There had been a church in Stow before the Danes, in 870, are documented to have burnt the church down. The building remained in ruins until an abbey was built in 1040, reputedly by bishop Eadnoth II.

Ralph de Diceto attributes the church's foundation to Elnothus Lincolniensis, almost certainly Aelfnoth, Bishop of Dorchester, c. 975, who built the church, possibly on the site of an earlier wooden Anglo-Saxon church, to serve as a minster (or mother church) for the Lincolnshire part of his large diocese. It was a second cathedral because part of the bishop's household of priests (which later became the cathedral chapter) lived in Stow and administered this part of the diocese. The memory of this period gave rise to the tradition that Stow is the Mother Church of Lincoln Cathedral.

It is said to have been re-founded and re-endowed in 1054 by Leofric and Godiva encouraged by Wulfwig as a minster of secular canons with the bishop at its head. In 1091 Remigius of Fécamp re-founded it as a Benedictine abbey - Stow Abbey - and brought monks to it from Eynsham Abbey, describing the church as having been a long time deserted and ruined. Within five years his successor had transferred the monks back to Eynsham and St Mary's had become a parish church.

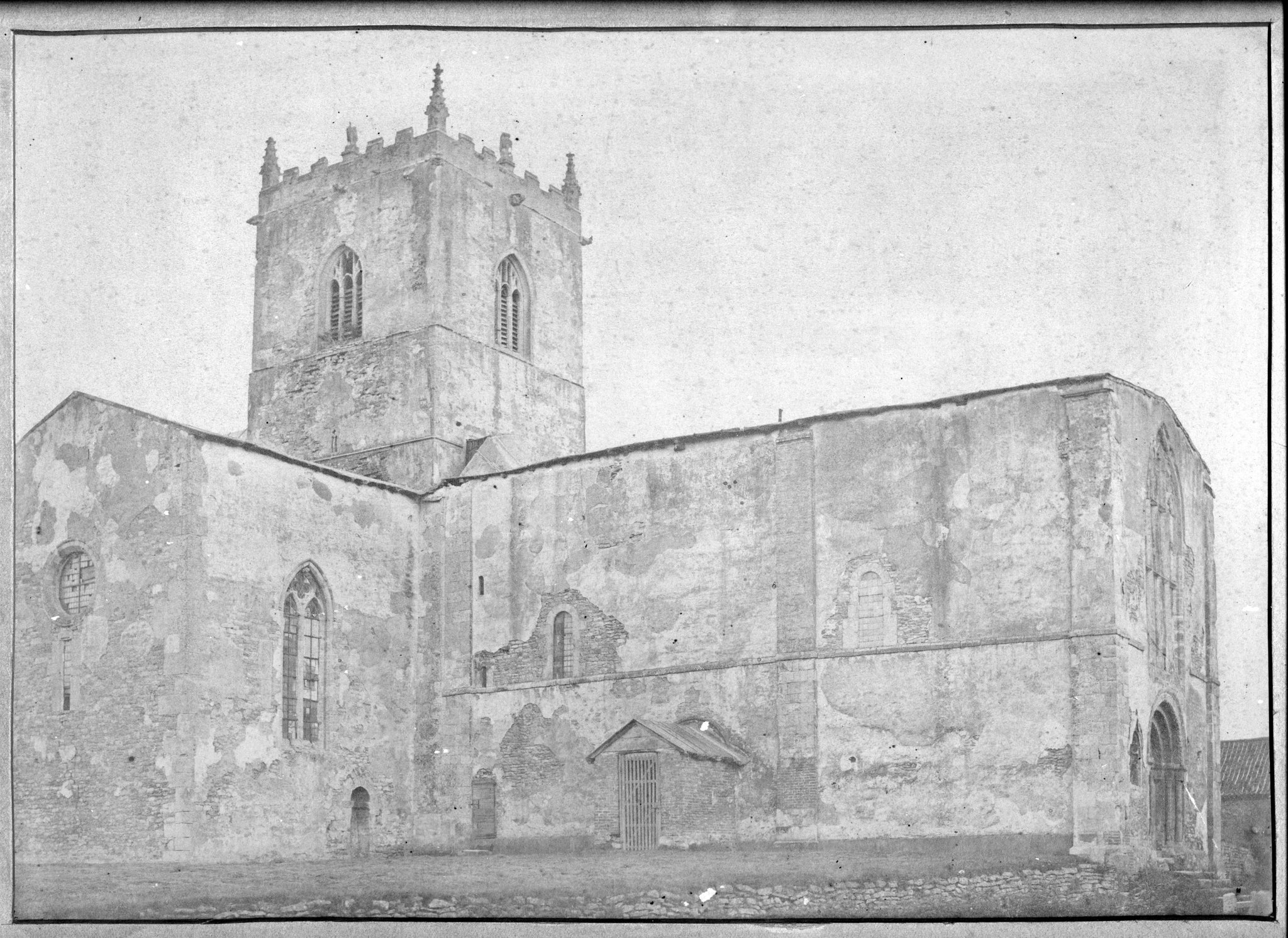
The Minster in 1865, before J. L. Pearson's Victorian restoration

In 1865 John Loughborough Pearson built the stair turret outside the church. This was originally inside the church in the nave up against the north side of the tower arch. At the same time some windows were altered and the church was re-roofed. A new vestry was added in the early 1990s (some skeletons and a broken 13th-century limestone cross were found during the work).

A mile to the west of the village and lying just to the south of the Roman road from Lincoln to York, known as Tillbridge Lane, are the remains of the medieval palace of the bishops of Lincoln built in 1336. All that can be seen today are the earthworks of the moat and to the north and east of the site the earthwork remains of its associated medieval fish-ponds.

== Conservation issues ==
The church is a Grade I listed building. It is included in the 100 most endangered sites in the world by the World Monuments Fund in 2006 and is on the Heritage at Risk Register of Historic England. The site is also a scheduled monument, though the building itself is excluded from the schedule.

The first stage of conservation needed is weatherproofing. Only then can internal decoration can be addressed. It is estimated that the work will take at least 10 years to complete and cost between £2 million and £3 million at current prices.

== See also ==
- List of ecclesiastical restorations and alterations by J. L. Pearson
