= Æthelstan Mannessune =

- Died: c. 986
- Known for: Patronage of Ramsey Abbey; father of Bishop Eadnoth
- Spouse: Spouse name is unknown (Note: Spouse was a relative of Oswald of Worcester, one-time Bishop of Worcester and Archbishop of York)
- Children: Godric, Eadnoth, Ælfwaru and Ælfwyn; Ælfwae (uncertain)
- Parent: Manne the Priest

Æthelstan Mannessune (died c. 986) was a landowner and monastic patron in late 10th-century Anglo-Saxon England, coming from a family of secularised priests. Remembered by Ely Abbey as an enemy, he and his family endowed Ramsey Abbey and allegedly provided it with a piece of the True Cross. His children became important in their own right, one of them, Eadnoth, becoming Abbot of Ramsey and Bishop of Dorchester, and another becoming abbess of Chatteris nunnery.

== Origins and reputation ==
Æthelstan came from a family of secularised priests in the Fens of the eastern Danelaw. He seems to have come from the Isle of Ely. His father, Manne, had owned land at Chatteris and Wold, both on Ely, while the Libellus Æthelwoldi Episcopi ("Little Book of Bishop Æthelwold") associated a priest named Manne with land at Haddenham, a place only a few miles distant. Æthelstan's recorded lands lay in Cambridgeshire, Huntingdonshire and Bedfordshire, with "outlying" [Hart] estates in Norfolk and Lincolnshire.

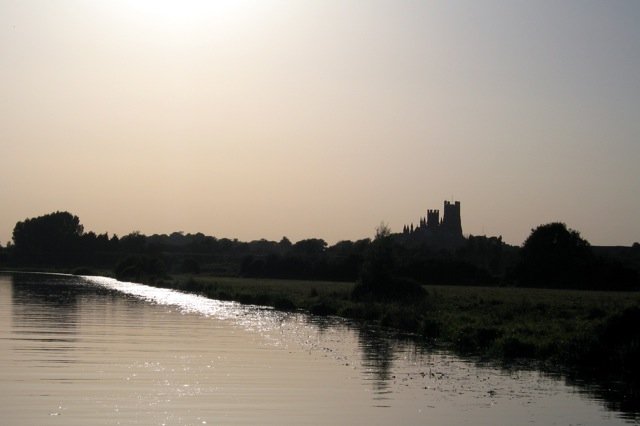
Modern Ely cathedral with the River Great Ouse in the foreground; though most of the Fenland was drained in the early modern period and Ely is no longer an island, the landscape retains some watery features

Æthelstan's reputation in church literature was varied. According to the Liber Eliensis he gave protection to a priest named Æthelstan in return for a payment of two marks after that priest had seized land from the monastery of Ely. According to the Liber Benefactorum Ecclesiae Ramesiensis, he donated a piece of the True Cross to Ramsey Abbey, though the Liber provides no information as to how Æthelstan acquired such a valuable relic.

== Legacy ==
According to the Liber Benefactorum, Æthelstan was married to a kinswoman of Oswald, one time Bishop of Worcester and Archbishop of York. He had two sons named Godric (died 1013) and Eadnoth (died 1016), and two daughters named Ælfwaru (died 1007) and Ælfwyn. It is possible that a woman named Ælfae was also his daughter, though this is uncertain. Godric, Ælfwaru and Ælfwyn (as well as Ælfae) all inherited estates from Æthelstan in addition to a fishery, while Eadnoth became a monk at Worcester, before becoming Abbot of Ramsey and Bishop of Dorchester. After Eadnoth founded a nunnery on his family lands at Chatteris, his younger sister Ælfwyn became abbess. In 1007 Chatteris nunnery received the lands of Over and Barley, following the death of their sister Ælfwaru.

Æthelstan seems to have died on 14 June 986. Subsequently his widow agreed to pass her manor of Slepe (what would become St Ives) to Ramsey Abbey, even though her late husband had left this to their daughter Ælfwyn. This led to a dispute as Æthelstan Mannessune's own kinsman, a priest named Osweard, claimed this inheritance, and even though Ramsey kept the land, the agreement they came to between 992 and 1006 involved handing two estates over to Osweard's son.
