= Germanus of Winchester =

11th-century English abbot

Germanus
- Abbot of Winchcombe Abbey
- Church: Winchcombe Abbey
- Appointed: c. 970
- Term ended: 975

Personal details
- Born: Germanus
- Died: c. 1013

Germanus (sometimes Germanus of Winchester, died circa 1013) was a medieval English abbot and Benedictine monk. He travelled to Rome in about 957 and became a monk at Fleury Abbey in France. Back in England by 964, he served as a monastic official before being named abbot of Winchcombe Abbey in about 970, a position he was removed from in 975. Germanus may have become abbot of Cholsey Abbey in 992.

== Early career ==
Although Germanus's name is not Anglo-Saxon, Byrhtferth, a contemporary who wrote the Vita Oswaldi, which contains much information on Germanus, states that he was a native of Winchester. Germanus accompanied Oscytel, the Archbishop of York, and Oswald of Worcester, on their trip to Rome in about 957, purportedly to collect Oscytel's pallium, the symbol of an archbishop's authority. This journey, however, has been challenged by the historian Donald A. Bullough, who argues that no previous archbishops of York had collected their palliums in person. He also points out that this story is only related in the Chronicon Abbatiae Rameseiensis, the chronicle of the Ramsey Abbey. According to the Ramsey story, Oscytel and Oswald returned to England, but Germanus remained on the continent and became a monk at Fleury Abbey in France. Another story has Oswald journeying to Fleury on his own, with Germanus arriving at Fleury after Oswald had been resident at Fleury for a number of years prior to 958.

== Return to England ==
In 963 or 964 Germanus was recalled to England by Oswald, who had recently founded a small monastic priory at Westbury-on-Trym. Germanus was named prior of that community and helped with teaching the novice monks. He was also prior of Ramsey Abbey, or perhaps dean, before becoming abbot of Winchcombe Abbey in about 970. Ramsey was founded by moving the monks of Westbury to Ramsey, but Germanus was not named abbot of Ramsey when this move was completed, being named abbot of Winchcombe instead. The reasons for this transfer are unrecorded. He was the first abbot of Winchcombe, but was removed from office in 975, as a result of political instability following the death of King Edgar of England in 975, when the monks at Winchcombe were exiled to Ramsey. The Chronicon Abbatiae Rameseiensis states that he became abbot of Cholsey Abbey in 992, and the Vita Oswaldi concurs with this statement. The Vita relates that when Oswald and the lay patron of Ramsey were near to death in 992 they urged the monks to elect Germanus as the next abbot of Ramsey when that office might become vacant. Instead, the monks elected another monk, and the Vita states that King Æthelred II of England appointed Germanus to Cholsey instead. Some historians have challenged Germanus' appointment to Cholsey, owing to the extreme length of ecclesiastical career this would necessitate.

== Later life and legacy ==
Germanus took part in the translation, or moving, of the relics of St Ivo to Ramsey in 1001 or the following year. He and Eadnoth, the abbot of Ramsey, carried the remains of the saint and his recently discovered companions from where they were found to Ramsey.

The "Ramsey Psalter" or "Psalter of Oswald", sometimes known as the "Harley Psalter", (now British Library manuscript (MS) Harley 2904) and the "Cambridge Psalter" (now Cambridge University Library MS Ff.1.23) as well as the "Sacramentary of Winchcombe" (now in Orléans, MS BM 127 (105)) have been connected with his abbacy.

Germanus died sometime around 1013. The Vita Oswaldi describes him as an expert in monastic affairs; a forged charter later described him as abbot of Fleury, although he never held that office.
