= Ælfwaru =

- Died: 27 February 1007
- Known for: Patronage of Ramsey Abbey and Ely Abbey
- Parent: Æthelstan Mannessune

Ælfwaru (died 27 February 1007) was an Anglo-Saxon noblewoman, who bequeathed her lands to churches such as Ely, and Ramsey. Chroniclers, writing in the 12th century, transcribed such bequests, from the original cyrographs. Ælfwaru's cyrograph has not survived. Ælfwaru's father, Æthelstan Mannessune, had two sons: Eadnoth, and Godric; and two daughters: Ælfwaru, and Ælfwyn.

== Lineage ==
Her lineage is unknown. However, modern historians have constructed a plausible family tree. Ælfwaru is believed to be one of two daughters to Æthelstan Mannessune (d. 986), the other being Ælfwyn, abbess of Chatteris. If this is the case, Ælfwaru's brothers were St Eadnoth the martyr (d. 1016), first abbot of Ramsey, and Godric (d.1013).

== Death ==
Ælfwaru is believed to have died on, or at least her obituary recorded for, 27 February. Liber Benefactorum Ecclesiae Ramesiensis records the year, 1007. Thus 27 February 1007.

== Legacy ==
It is recorded within one chronicle, Liber Eliensis, that Ælfwaru granted to Ely Abbey the lands of Bridgham, Hingham, Weeting, Rattlesden, Mundford, Thetford, and fisheries around those marshes. Ælfwaru also granted the lands of Over and Barley to Chatteris nunnery, where her sister was abbess. The fisheries mentioned here are interesting. They link the Ælfwaru mentioned in Liber Eliensis, with the Ælfwaru, daughter of Æthelstan Mannessune, whose cyrograph is documented in Liber Benefactorum Ecclesiae Ramesiensis. If this is indeed the same Ælfwaru, then her father bequeathed lands to his children, including a fishery, which he shared out between his unnamed wife, his sons, and his two daughters.

The name Ælfwaru is made out of two parts; old English (OE) Ælf- and -waru. Ælf- means Elf- or magical being and -waru (singular; -wara plural) means guardian of (a particular place) by profession.
