= Coenwulf (disambiguation) =

Coenwulf, or variants, may refer to:

== People ==
- King Coenwulf of Mercia (died 821)
- Bishop Coenwulf of Dorchester (early 10th century)
- Bishop Cenwulf of Winchester (died 1006)
- Cynewulf, King of Wessex from 757 until 786

== Other uses ==
- MV Cenwulf, a ferry between mainland England and the Isle of Wight
