= Ceobred =

9th-century Bishop of Leicester

- Bishop of Leicester
- Appointed: between December 840 and 844
- Term ended: between 869 and 888
- Predecessor: Ealdred
- Successor: Harlardus (Bishop of Dorchester)

Orders
- Consecration: between December 840 and 844

Personal details
- Died: between 869 and 888
- Denomination: Christian

Ceobred (or Ceolred) was a medieval Bishop of Leicester.

Ceobred was consecrated between December 840 and 844. He died between 869 and 888. In 844, he gave land at Pangbourne on the Thames River to Berhtwulf, king of Mercia, in return for a grant of liberties for some monasteries.

== Citations ==
Christian titles
Preceded by Ealdred of Leicester	Bishop of Leicester c. 842–c. 878	Succeeded by Harlardus as Bishop of Dorchester
