= Stow, Lincolnshire =

Village and civil parish in Lincolnshire, England

Coordinates: 53.3269°N 0.6748°W

Stow
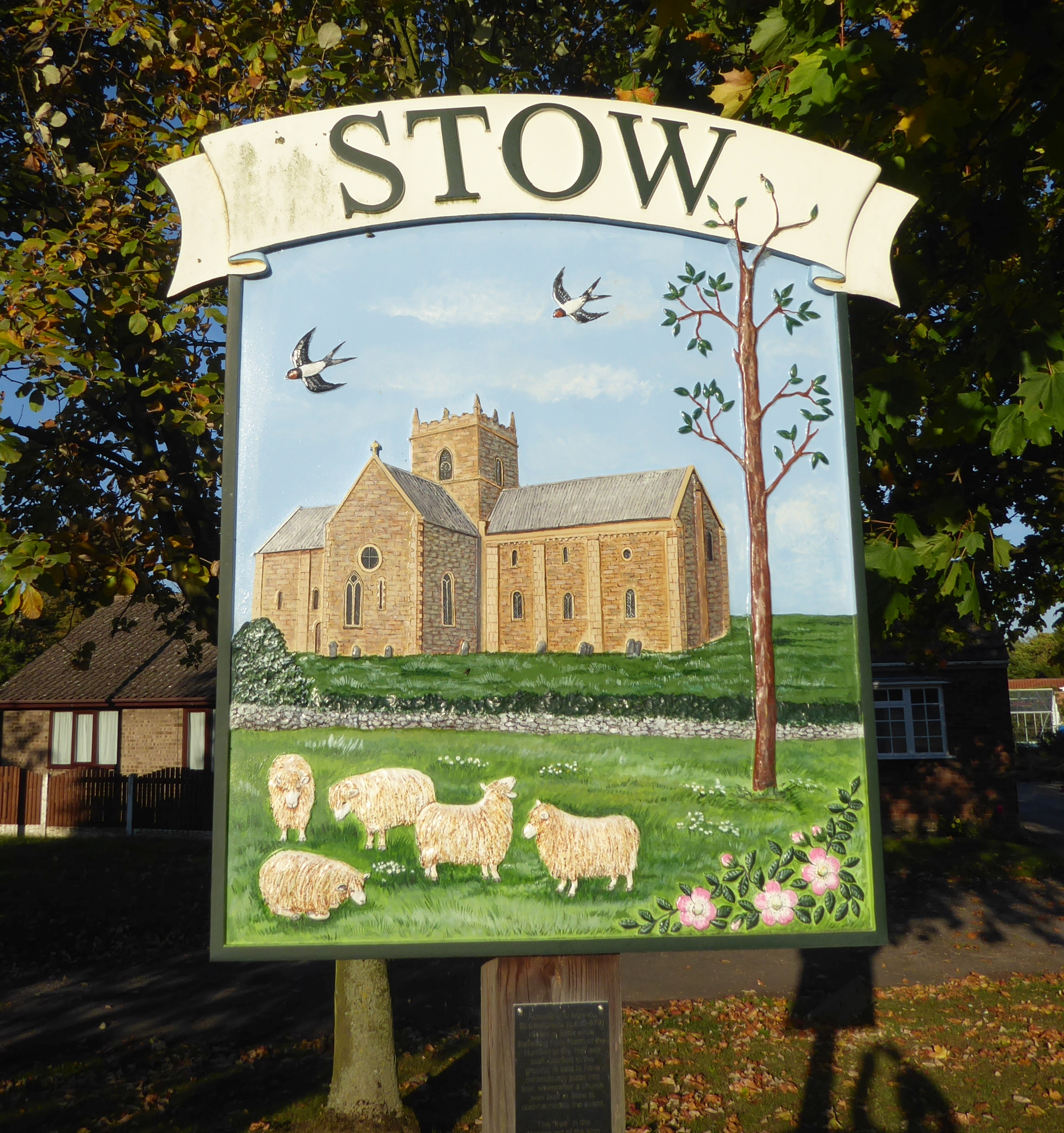
- Stow village sign showing Stow Minster

- Location within Lincolnshire
- Population: 365 (2011 Census)
- OS grid reference: SK882819
  - London: 125 mi (201 km) S
- District: West Lindsey
- Shire county: Lincolnshire
- Region: East Midlands
- Country: England
- Sovereign state: United Kingdom
- Post town: LINCOLN
- Postcode district: LN1
- Dialling code: 01427
- Police: Lincolnshire
- Fire: Lincolnshire
- Ambulance: East Midlands

Stow (or, archaically, Stow-in-Lindsey) is a village and civil parish within the West Lindsey district of Lincolnshire, England. It is 11 miles (18 km) north-west of Lincoln and 6 miles (10 km) south-east of Gainsborough, and lies along the B1241 road. The total resident population was 355 at the 2001 census, increasing to 365 (and including Thorpe in the Fallows) at the 2011 census.

The parish of Stow, which includes other localities such as Coates, is today a mixture of modern brick and older stone-built housing, some of the latter being thatched. The village has a public house, the Cross Keys, a Methodist chapel, and the remains of a large minster church.

There is another Stow in Lincolnshire, the site of a lost village and medieval fair, between Threekingham and Billingborough. The location is now known as Stow Green Hill. There is also Shepeau Stow near Spalding.

== History ==
Stow dates back to Roman times and in the Anglo-Saxon period was known as Sidnaceaster ("ceaster" meant fortification or camp). Its parish church, Stow Minster, is one of the oldest churches in Britain. As Sidnacestre, it is a titular see or bishopric in Roman Catholicism.

Stow means "Holy Place". There is evidence of Roman activity within the village, including the discovery of ancient coins, ruins and foundations from this period.

Around 1640, the rector's son, George Clifford, moved from Stow to Amsterdam. His grandson George Clifford III became the maecēnās (patron) of Carl von Linné the Swedish botanist.

== Governance ==
Lying within the historic county boundaries of Lincolnshire from a very early time, Stow lay within the Well hundred of the ancient Parts of Lindsey, having previously formed part of the ancient Anglo-Saxon Kingdom of Lindsey.

As a result of the Poor Law Amendment Act 1834, the parish of Stow became part of the Gainsborough Poor Law Union, and later, for civil registration matters, part of the Willingham sub-district of the Gainsborough Registration District. In 1974, as part of the provisions of the Local Government Act 1972, Stow was given to the newly created non-metropolitan district of West Lindsey, though remained within the county of Lincolnshire.

== Stow Minster ==
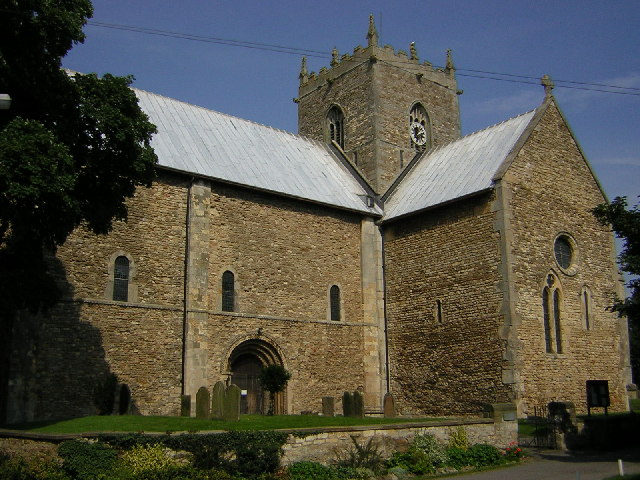
The Minster Church of St Mary, Stow-in-Lindsey

There had been a church at Stow even before the arrival of the Danes in 870 – the year they are documented to have burnt the church down. The building remained in ruins until an abbey was built in 1040, reputedly by Bishop Eadnoth II. It is partly Saxon and partly Norman in date and is designated by English Heritage as a Scheduled Ancient Monument and was also included in the World Monuments Fund's 2006 list of the world's 100 most endangered sites. The arches in the Anglo-Saxon part are the tallest of their era in Britain.

A mile to the west of the village and lying just to the south of the Roman road known as Tillbridge Lane are the remains of the medieval palace of the Bishops of Lincoln built in 1336. All that can be seen today are the earthworks of the moat and to the north and east of the site the earthwork remains of its associated medieval fish-ponds.
