= Edinaldo (given name) =

Edinaldo is a Portuguese masculine given name, derived from a Germanic cognate of the Old English name Edwald, that may refer to the following notable people:

- Grafite, nickname of Edinaldo Batista Libânio (born 1979), Brazilian footballer
- Edinaldo Batista dos Santos (born 1987), Brazilian midfielder also known as simply Edinaldo
- Edinaldo Filgueira, (ca. 1975 – 2011), Brazilian blogger and journalist, editor
- Naldo (footballer, born 1988), nickname of Edinaldo Gomes Pereira (born 1988), Brazilian professional footballer

== See also ==
- Edinaldo (disambiguation)
- Ednaldo da Conceição, also known as Naldo
