= Ælfhelm =

Ælfhelm is a given name. Notable people with the name include:

- Ælfhelm of Dorchester (died 1007/9), bishop of Dorchester
- Ælfhelm of York (died 1006), ealdorman of southern Northumbria
