= Wigmund =

Wigmund may refer to the following people:

- Wigmund (archbishop of York)
- Wigmund (bishop of Dorchester)
- Wigmund of Mercia
