= Unwona =

8th-century Bishop of Leicester

- Bishop of Leicester
- Appointed: between 781 and 785
- Term ended: between 801 and 803
- Predecessor: Eadbeorht
- Successor: Wernbeorht

Orders
- Consecration: between 781 and 785

Personal details
- Died: between 801 and 803
- Denomination: Christian

Unwona (also Unuuona, Unwano) was a medieval Bishop of Leicester.

Unwona was consecrated between 781 and 785. He died between 801 and 803.

Unwona appears as a witness to records of ecclesiastical councils and Mercian royal charters twenty times between 785 and around 800. Unwona's name is rare or even unique among Anglo-Saxon names, and seems to derive from Old English wana ('lack'), and to mean 'not lacking'. It is possible that he was the addressee of a letter sent in 797 by Alcuin of York to one 'Speratus'; the letter includes Alcuin's most famous injunction: 'verba Dei legantur in sacerdotali convivio: ibi decet lectorem audiri, non citharistam, sermones patrum, non carmina gentilium. Quid Hinieldus cum Christo?' ('Let God's words be read at the episcopal dinner-table. It is right that a reader should be heard, not a harpist, patristic discourse, not pagan song. What has Hinield to do with Christ?').

== Citations ==
Christian titles
Preceded by Eadbeorht	Bishop of Leicester c. 783–c. 802	Succeeded by Wernbeorht
