= Eadnoth the Younger =

11th-century Bishop of Dorchester and Abbot of Ramsey

Eadnoth
- Bishop of Dorchester
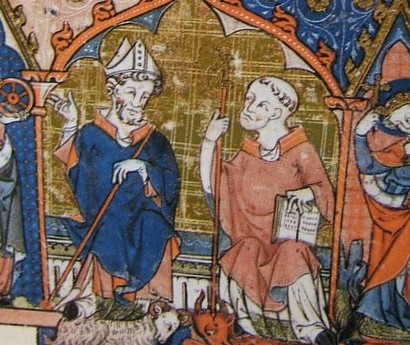
- Miniature of a bishop and an abbot from the 14th-century Ramsey Psalter, thought to be Oswald (left) and his kinsman Eadnoth (right)
- Province: Canterbury
- Diocese: Dorchester
- Installed: Between 1007 and 1009
- Term ended: 1016
- Predecessor: Ælfhelm
- Successor: Æthelric
- Other post: Previously Abbot of Ramsey (c. 992—1007 x 1009)

Personal details
- Parents: Æthelstan Mannessune and unknown (kinswoman of Archbishop Oswald)
- Profession: Monk

Sainthood
- Feast day: 18 October
- Patronage: Ramsey Abbey
- Shrines: Ely Cathedral (medieval)
- Cult suppressed: See Dissolution of the Monasteries

Eadnoth the Younger or Eadnoth I was a medieval monk and prelate, successively Abbot of Ramsey and Bishop of Dorchester. From a prominent family of priests in the Fens, he was related to Oswald, Bishop of Worcester, Archbishop of York and founder of Ramsey Abbey. Following in the footsteps of his illustrious kinsman, he initially became a monk at Worcester. He is found at Ramsey supervising construction works in the 980s, and around 992 actually became Abbot of Ramsey. As abbot, he founded two daughter houses in what is now Cambridgeshire, namely, a monastery at St Ives and a nunnery at Chatteris. At some point between 1007 and 1009, he became Bishop of Dorchester, a see that encompassed much of the eastern Danelaw. He died at the Battle of Assandun in 1016, fighting Cnut the Great.

== Family ==
Eadnoth the Younger was the son of Æthelstan Mannessune by a kinswoman of Oswald, Bishop of Worcester and Archbishop of York. His father came from family of hereditary Fenland priests from in or around the Isle of Ely. Æthelstan had lands in Cambridgeshire, Huntingdonshire and Bedfordshire, with "outlying" [Hart] estates in Norfolk and Lincolnshire. Eadnoth is styled "the Younger", Iunior, to distinguish him from Eadnoth "the Elder", Senior, the follower of Oswald who served as prior of the monastery of Ramsey in the years before Eadnoth the Younger became abbot.

Eadnoth the Younger had one brother, Godric (died 1013), and at least two sisters, Ælfwaru (died 1007) and Ælfwyn, all of whom inherited estates (in addition to a fishery) from their father. Eadnoth, by contrast, became a monk at Worcester Abbey, where his mother's kinsman Oswald was bishop, and thus could not inherit anything. Eadnoth appears for the first time in the 980s when, according to the Liber Benefactorum Ecclesiae Ramesiensis, he supervised the repair of the western tower of Ramsey Abbey. Eadnoth became Abbot of Ramsey in 992, having probably already taken over Eadnoth the Elder's duties as prior from at least 991, if not earlier.

== Abbot of Ramsey ==
The Liber Benefactorum calls Eadnoth the Younger the "first abbot of Ramsey". It says that he was elected according to the Benedictine Rule by the monks of Ramsey, after Ealdorman Æthelwine had given Germanus enough money to found a new monastery at Cholsey. Ramsey had had two communities of monks, those who had been moved by Oswald there from Westbury on Trym in the 960s, and those who had fled there in the 980s from Winchcombe because of the anti-monastic reaction in Mercia; until 992, Oswald, who died in 992, had been titular abbot of the former with Eadnoth the Elder as his prior, while the Winchcombe monks had Germanus as their abbot.

According to historian Cyril Hart, "there is no shred of doubt" that Eadnoth the Younger obtained this office through the influence of Oswald. Although such nepotism contradicted the usual spirit of the Benedictine revival in England at the time, Oswald himself had similarly advanced because of family connections. As abbot Eadnoth founded a nunnery on his family lands at Chatteris, and his younger sister Ælfwyn became its first abbess. In 1007, the Chatteris nunnery received the lands of Over and Barley, following the death of their sister Ælfwaru.

Eadnoth also founded a monastery at St Ives, Cambridgeshire. Established as a daughter-house of Ramsey (like Chaterris), the monastery's entire endowment consisted of Slepe (what became St Ives) as well as part of Elsworth and Knapworth. All of these lands (including their churches) had been the property of Eadnoth's father Æthelstan. Elsworth had been left to Ramsey in the will of Eadnoth's sister Ælfwaru. On 24 April 1002, soon after founding St Ives, he translated its eponymous saintly resident—discovered by a ploughing peasant a year before—to Ramsey Abbey.

== Bishop of Dorchester ==
At some point between 1007 and 1009, Eadnoth became Bishop of Dorchester. Dorchester was a sprawling diocese based far to the south of most of its territory in the eastern Danelaw, at Dorchester on Thames. It was roughly equivalent to the pre-Viking east Mercian diocese of Leicester, and after Eadnoth's episcopate came to include the Diocese of Lindsey too. In the Norman era the bishopric's seat returned north and became the well-known bishopric of Lincoln.

Little is known of Eadnoth's episcopate. His first appearance as bishop is as a witness to a charter of 1009, issued by King Æthelred to a thegn named Morcar; the last notice of Eadnoth's predecessor as bishop, Ælfhelm, occurs in a similar document of 1007. Eadnoth subsequently subscribes at least another eight royal charters before his death, all between 1011 and 1013, with a possible further subscription in 1016. On 18 October 1016, Bishop Eadnoth fought and was martyred at the Battle of Assandun in Essex, alongside Wulfsifge, his successor as abbot of Ramsey, and Æthelweard son of Ealdorman Æthelwine [of East Anglia]. He was fighting on behalf of Edmund Ironside against Cnut, the Danish invader who was claiming the English crown.

Eadnoth's body was taken north into the Fenlands, heading back to Ramsey. According to the Liber Eliensis, the guards of the body stopped at Ely Abbey and got drunk, during which the Ely monks seized and hid the body. The plot was led by Ælfgar, formerly Bishop of Elmham. Thereafter the body remained at Ely, where Eadnoth the Martyr was venerated as a saint.

It is thought that Abbot Eadnoth is the abbot depicted alongside a bishop (his kinsman Bishop Oswald) in one of the miniatures in the 14th-century Ramsey Psalter (not to be confused with British Museum MS Harley 2904). Below Bishop Oswald is a ram, after the first element of the place-name Ramsey, and below Eadnoth a bull, in reference to the foundation legend of the abbey.

== Citations ==
Christian titles
| New title | Abbot of Ramsey c. 992–1006x1008 | Succeeded by Wulfsige |
| Preceded by Ælfhelm | Bishop of Dorchester; 1007 x 1009–1016 | Succeeded by Æthelric |
