= Wynsige =

10th-century Bishop of Dorcester

- Bishop of Dorchester
- Appointed: between 909 and 925
- Term ended: between 934 and 945
- Predecessor: Coenwulf of Dorchester
- Successor: Æthelwold

Orders
- Consecration: between 909 and 925

Personal details
- Died: between 934 and 945
- Denomination: Christian

Wynsige was a medieval Bishop of Dorchester.

Wynsige was consecrated between 909 and 925 and died between 934 and 945.

== Citations ==
Christian titles
Preceded by Coenwulf of Dorchester	Bishop of Dorchester c. 914 – c. 940	Succeeded by Æthelwold
