= Eadbeorht of Leicester =

8th-century Bishop of Leicester

Eadbeorht
- Bishop of Leicester
- Installed: c. 764
- Term ended: between 781 and 785
- Predecessor: Torhthelm
- Successor: Unwona

Orders
- Consecration: 764

Personal details
- Died: between 781 and 785
- Denomination: Christian

Eadbeorht (or Eadberht) was a medieval Bishop of Leicester. He was consecrated in 764. He died between 781 and 785.

== Citations ==
Christian titles
| Preceded by Torhthelm | Bishop of Leicester; 764–c. 783 | Succeeded by Unwona |
