= Cuthwine of Leicester =

7th-century Bishop of Leicester

Cuthwine
- Bishop of Leicester
- Appointed: 679
- Term ended: c. 691
- Predecessor: new foundation
- Successor: Wilfrid

Orders
- Consecration: 679

Personal details
- Died: c. 691

Cuthwine was a medieval Bishop of Leicester.

Cuthwine was consecrated in 679. He died about 691.

== Citations ==
Christian titles
New title new foundation	Bishop of Leicester; 679–c. 691	Succeeded by Wilfrid
