= Ealdred of Leicester =

9th-century Bishop of Leicester

Ealdred
- Bishop of Leicester
- Installed: between 839 and December 840
- Term ended: between December 840 and 844
- Predecessor: Hræthhun
- Successor: Ceobred

Personal details
- Died: between December 840 and 844
- Denomination: Christian

Ealdred was a medieval Bishop of Leicester.

Ealdred was consecrated between 839 and December 840. He died between December 840 and 844.

== Citations ==
Christian titles
Preceded by Hræthhun	Bishop of Leicester c. 840-c. 842	Succeeded by Ceobred
