= Ulfus Normanus =

11th-century Bishop of Dorchester

- See: Bishop of Dorchester
- Term ended: 14 September 1052
- Predecessor: Eadnothus II
- Successor: Wulfinus

Orders
- Consecration: 1049

Personal details
- Denomination: Catholic

Ulfus Normanus (or Ulf) was a medieval Bishop of Dorchester, when the town was seat of the united dioceses of Lindsey and Dorchester.

Ulf was consecrated in 1049 and was expelled on 14 September 1052.

== Citations ==
Christian titles
Preceded by Eadnothus II	Bishop of Dorchester; 1050–1052	Succeeded by Wulfinus
