= Ramsey Abbey Gatehouse =

Coordinates: 52.448365°N 0.103012°W

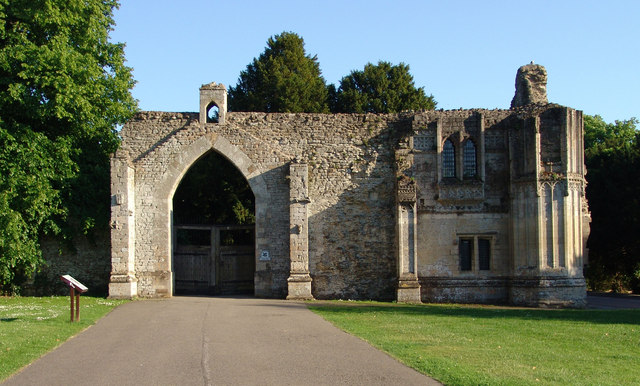
- the remains of the gatehouse in Ramsey
- Interactive map of Ramsey Abbey Gatehouse
- Location: Ramsey, Cambridgeshire, England

History
- Built: 15th century
- Demolished: 1537

Site notes
- Area: Huntingdonshire
- Governing body: National Trust

Listed Building – Grade I
- Official name: Gatehouse to Ramsey Abbey
- Designated: 1 May 1951
- Reference no.: 1130258

Ramsey Abbey Gatehouse was the gatehouse to the Benedictine Ramsey Abbey in Ramsey, Huntingdonshire (now part of Cambridgeshire), England. The gatehouse is Perpendicular Gothic and was built late in the 15th century.

In 1537 the abbey was dissolved and the Crown granted its buildings and site to Richard Williams (alias Cromwell), who used most of the buildings as a surface quarry for the Barnack stone. He had part of the gatehouse (believed to be the outer gatehouse) dismantled, moved to Hinchingbrooke House and rebuilt as its gatehouse there. The remainder of the gatehouse survives as a ruin at Ramsey.

In 1951 the Ministry of Works made the gatehouse a Grade I listed building. In 1952 Ailwyn Fellowes, 3rd Baron de Ramsey gave the gatehouse to the National Trust in memory of his sister Diana Broughton.

== Sources and further reading ==
- Page, WH; Proby, Granville (eds.); Norris, HE (1926). A History of the County of Huntingdon. Victoria County History. Vol. 1. London: St Catherine Press. pp. 377–385.
- Pevsner, Nikolaus (1968). Bedfordshire and the County of Huntingdon and Peterborough. The Buildings of England. Harmondsworth: Penguin Books. p. 332. ISBN 0-14-0710-34-5.
- RCHME, ed. (1926). An Inventory of the Historical Monuments in Huntingdonshire. London: His Majesty's Stationery Office. pp. 204–211.
