= Æthelric (bishop of Dorchester) =

11th-century Bishop of Dorchester

Eadhericus
- See: Bishop of Dorchester
- Term ended: 8 December 1034
- Predecessor: Eadnothus
- Successor: Eadnothus

Orders
- Consecration: 1016

Personal details
- Died: 8 December 1034
- Denomination: Christian

Æthelric (or Brihtmær) (Note: Latin: Eadhericus) was a medieval Bishop of Dorchester, when the town was seat of the united dioceses of Lindsey and Dorchester.

Æthelric was consecrated in 1016 and died on 8 December 1034.

When Æthelric was young, he was educated at Abingdon Abbey. A story about him claims that one day he and three other boys caused trouble by ringing the bell very hard. The bell cracked, and it was very expensive to replace. When the abbot learned what happened, he decided to pardon them because they were young aristocrats and when they were older, they were likely to pay far more than the value of this bell in gifts to the monastery.

In another story, when Æthelric was bishop during the time of King Cnut, one day he was travelling with Cnut and stayed the night in the house of a rich Dane. The Dane got drunk and offered to sell an estate for 50 marks. Æthelric, perhaps wishing to clinch the deal before the man became sober, then quickly sent a messenger to Cnut to ask for help. The king was playing a game of chess, but he offered the money to Æthelric, who then finalized the purchase.

== Citations ==
Christian titles
| Preceded by Eadnothus | Bishop of Dorchester; 1016–1034 | Succeeded by Eadnothus |
