= Oscytel =

Archbishop of York from 958 to 971

- Archbishop of York
- Appointed: 958
- Term ended: 971
- Predecessor: Wulfstan
- Successor: Edwald
- Other post: Bishop of Dorchester

Orders
- Consecration: between 934 and 951

Personal details
- Died: 971 Thame
- Buried: Bedford

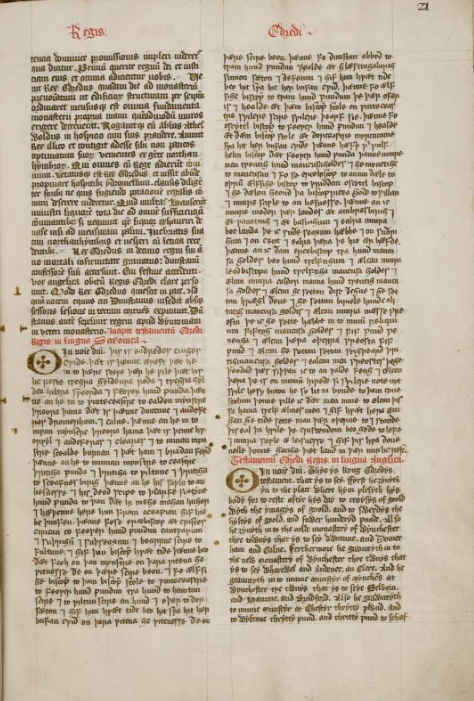
The will of King Eadred, 951–955, with bequests to "Oscytel biscop" (15th-century copy, British Library Add MS 82931, ff. 22r–23r)

Oscytel (or Oskytel or Oscetel; died 971) was a medieval Bishop of Dorchester and Archbishop of York.

== Early life ==
Oscytel was probably of Danish ancestry. (Note: Oscytel, Oskytel is the anglicized version of the Old Norse name Ásketill.) He was related to Oswald, Bishop of Worcester and later Archbishop of York, and Thurcytel, who was abbot of Bedford Abbey. All three men were landowners in the eastern midlands, with Oscytel owning lands at Beeby, in Leicestershire. No other information about Oscytel's birth and upbringing is known. A legend stated that his father was a Dane who arrived in England as part of a pagan war band.

== Bishop ==
Oscytel was selected to the see of Dorchester sometime between 934 and 951, probably close to 951 for the Anglo-Saxon Chronicle says that he had been a bishop for twenty-two years when he died. 951 is also when he first attests a charter as bishop. A previous mention of an "Oscetel" as either a sacrist or treasurer in 949 may or may not be the same person. Oscytel only starts showing up consistently after the death of King Eadred of England, who left the bishop some bequests in his will. Oscytel attested the charters of King Eadwig until the kingdom was divided between him and his brother Edgar in 957, who then became king of Mercia and Northumbria, and thus of the territory of the Dorchester diocese. Oscytel thereafter attested Edgar's charters.

== Archbishop ==
Oscytel became archbishop in 958. However, he continued to hold the see of Dorchester along with York, a practice known as pluralism. It is probably due to Oscytel's pluralism that Nottinghamshire was added to the see of York instead of remaining with Dorchester, where it had been before. The Anglo Saxon Chronicle from Ramsey says that he went to Rome for his pallium, but no other sources say that he did so. While archbishop he advanced the career of his kinsman Oswald by bringing him to the attention of Dunstan, and encouraging Oswald's foundation of Ramsey Abbey. Oscytel also was a benefactor to the new monastic houses that were formed in the fens during his time as archbishop. The precise nature of Oscytel's and Oswald's relationship is unclear, but they were relatives.

== Death ==
Oscytel died on 1 November 971 or on 31 October 971 at Thame, and was buried at Bedford. The ancient minster of St Paul's Church, Bedford is accepted as the site of his grave.

== Citations ==
Christian titles
Preceded by Æthelwold	Bishop of Dorchester between 934 and 951–958	Succeeded by Wulfric
Preceded by Wulfstan	Archbishop of York; 958–971	Succeeded by Edwald
