= Church of St Thomas à Becket, Ramsey =

St Thomas à Becket, Ramsey
- Church of St Thomas à Becket, Ramsey
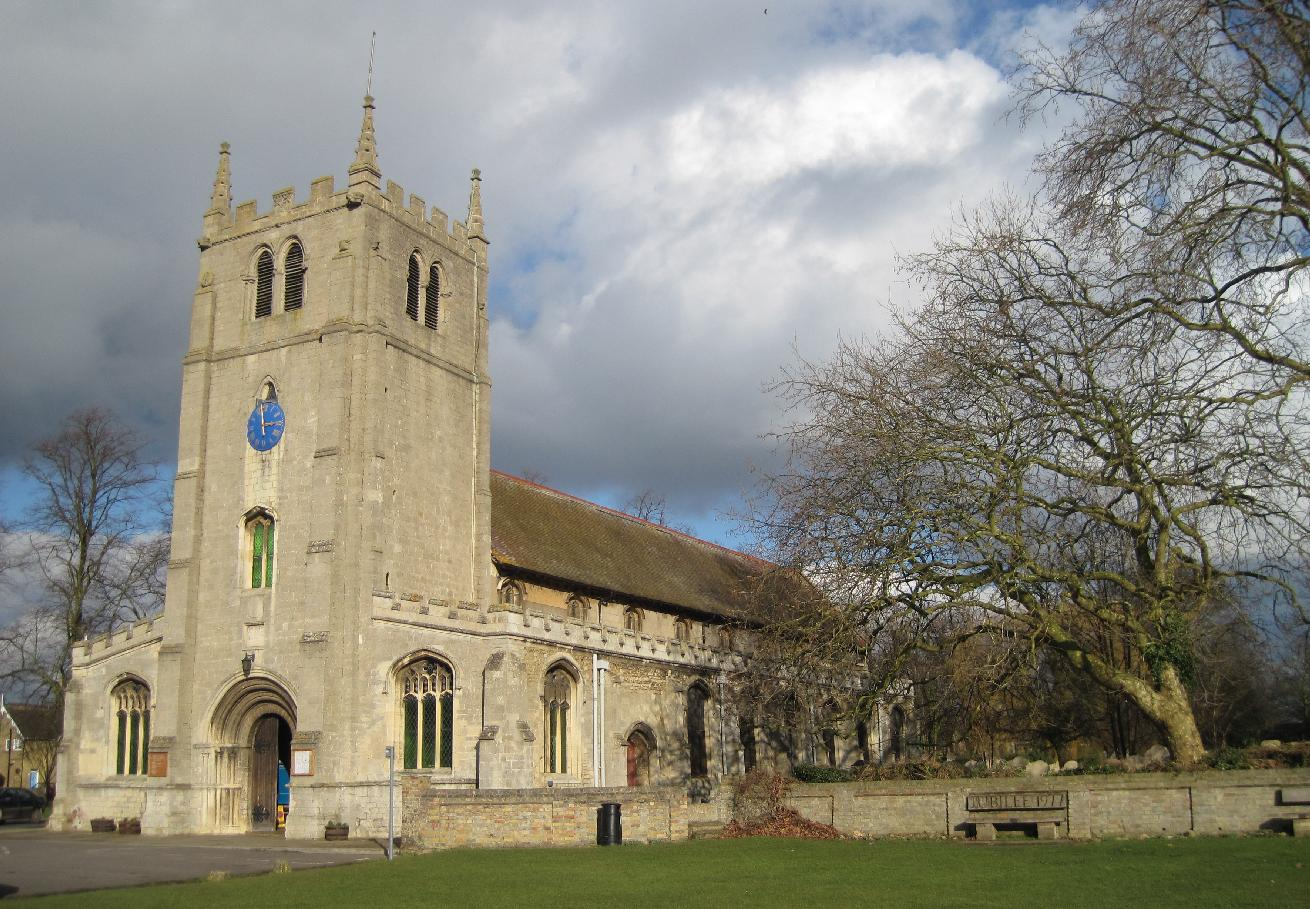
- view from the southwest
- St Thomas à Becket, Ramsey
- 52.448981°N 0.102234°W
- OS grid reference: TL 29074 85149
- Location: Ramsey, Cambridgeshire
- Country: England
- Denomination: Church of England
- Previous denomination: Roman Catholic
- Website: https://www.ramseysandupwood.org/

History
- Status: church
- Dedication: Thomas Becket

Architecture
- Functional status: active
- Heritage designation: Grade I listed
- Style: English Gothic
- Years built: 12th–17th centuries

Specifications
- Materials: stone

Administration
- Province: Canterbury
- Diocese: Ely

Clergy
- Vicar: Rev'd Iain Osborne

The Church of St Thomas à Becket, Ramsey is the Church of England parish church of Ramsey, Cambridgeshire (formerly Huntingdonshire). The parish is part of a benefice that includes also the parish of Upwood with Great and Little Raveley.

The church was built late in the 12th century as part of Ramsey Abbey, possibly the hospitium. It was converted into a parish church early in the 13th century. It is a Grade I listed building.

== History ==
The oldest part of the building dates from around AD 1180–90, when it was built as a hospital, infirmary or guesthouse of the abbey. It was originally an aisled hall with a chapel at the east end with a vestry on the north side and the warden's lodgings on the south, but both these have been demolished. The building was converted into a parish church about AD 1222.

The building is mainly of rubble masonry, but the aisles and other parts are of ashlar. The roofs of the chancel and nave are covered with tiles and the aisles with lead. The buildings internal dimensions are chancel 22 by 20 feet (6.7 by 6.1 m), nave 93 by 19 feet (28.3 by 5.8 m), west tower 14 by 15 feet (4.3 by 4.6 m) at the base, north aisle 13 feet (4 m) wide, south aisle 13 feet (4 m) wide. There are also a north chapel and a south chapel.

The building is of unusual plan. The very small chancel, the long nave and the absence of a tower from the original church imply, as the investigators of the Royal Commission on Historical Monuments suggest, that the building may have been designed for a hospital, infirmary or guest house. The chancel would form the chapel, and the nave the hall of such an establishment.

As in the case of all monasteries whose foundation predates the Norman conquest of England, the parishioners of Ramsey would have had rights in the monastic church. After the introduction of stricter monastic rule and more elaborate services in the 12th century, and particularly the Sunday Procession, the parochial services interfered with those of the monks. Therefore, accommodation for the parishioners was made at a parochial chapel outside the monastic church, at Holy Cross Church, Bury, Cambridgeshire.

The late 12th-century building consisted of a chancel, with north and south chapels, nave and aisles. The south chapel was demolished about 1310, before, or at the time that the early 14th-century window was inserted in the south wall of the chancel, but the north chapel was standing in 1744. The aisles appear to have been rebuilt about 1500. The west tower was built in 1672. There was formerly a south porch, destroyed in 1843, which probably belonged to the period of the rebuilding of the south aisle about 1500. A north vestry was built on the site of the north chapel in 1910, and the church was restored in 1844 at the behest of Edward Fellowes. At that time some of its ancient fittings were removed, including a chancel screen and some old glass. The gallery was removed in 1903.

The chancel is vaulted, and is lit by a large east window of three round-headed lights, deeply splayed, above which is a vesica-shaped window and high up in the gable a round-headed window, now blocked, which at one time lit the space over the vault. In the south wall is an early 14th-century window of two pointed lights with a trefoil above in a roundhead, and farther west is a doorway of about 1600, with a four-centred arch in a square head. In the north is a doorway of uncertain date, leading into the modern north vestry.

The vestry has a late 15th-century north window of three cinquefoiled lights, with tracery in a four-centred head, taken from the east wall of the north aisle. In the south wall of this vestry are the remains of the vaulting shafts, with cushion capitals for the vault of the 12th-century chapel which stood here. Similar remains for the vaulting shafts of the south chapel are still preserved outside the south wall of the chancel. The 12th-century chancel arch has a two-centred head, and the responds have scalloped capitals and moulded bases. There was formerly a chancel screen stretching across the nave and aisles at the first pier, which was taken down in 1844.

The nave was formerly of eight bays, but one bay has been embedded in the western tower. The arcades are fine examples of 12th-century work. The arches are all two-centred of two plain orders, but the piers, although corresponding in the pairs opposite one another, differ, each pair from the other, some being of grouped shafts, others round and octagonal. The capitals in like manner differ, some scalloped, others have water-leaves and volutes. Over the second pier on each side is the entrance, now blocked, to the rood loft, indications of which may be seen on the south side. The clerestory, consisting of seven windows of two cinquefoiled lights in four-centred heads on each side, is of 15th-century date. The north and south aisles have windows of similar detail each with three cinquefoiled lights in a four-centred head, all of about 1500, and the north and south doorways are of the same date.

The blue marble hexagonal font of about 1200 was found about 1844 buried below the floor of the aisle. It has a circular central shaft and six angle shafts.

The 15th-century oak lectern has a steep double rotating desk, supported on a square stem with four traceried buttresses surmounted by figures of the evangelists. It has been restored. On it are the Paraphrase of Erasmus and Comber on the Book of Common Prayer. The latter still has a chain attached to it.

=== West tower ===
There seems to have been an intention to build a west tower early in the 16th century. John Lawrence, the last Abbot of Ramsey, by his will dated 29 February 1537–38, directed that £13 6s. 8d. should be paid "towards the building a stepull in the parish church of Ramsey when the town will build it". The town at that time seems to have built only "a low wooden steeple".

In 1672 the wooden steeple collapsed and was replaced by the present west tower, built with material taken from the monastic buildings. The tower is of four stages, with embattled parapet and crocketed pinnacles at the angles. The tower arch is two-centred, with semi-cylindrical responds, having two attached shafts, scalloped capitals and moulded bases. The west doorway is also of 12th-century material, re-set, probably, from the original west doorway. Over the doorway on the outside in a panel is the inscription "Take heed, watch and pray for ye know not when the time is. S. Mar. 13, 33". In the west wall of the second stage is a 15th-century window of two cinquefoiled lights re-set, over which, in the third stage, is another window made from re-set material. In the bell chamber is a window in each wall, made up from 12th-century and 13th-century material and a 12th-century string course re-used. A beam of the bell frame bears the inscription, "1672 Nevill Jones et Thomas Wallis, churchwardens".

There are said to have been four bells before the building of the tower in 1672, hung in a low wooden steeple. These four bells were, with some additional metal, cast into five. In 1810 Robert Taylor recast these bells at his St Neots bell-foundry to form the present ring of six. The church has also a sanctus bell, which is not inscribed but is estimated to have been cast at the end of the 15th century.

== Monuments inside the church ==
Inside the church are numerous monuments.
On the north side of the chancel:

- William Henry Fellowes (died 1837)
- Mary Julia widow of Edward first Lord de Ramsey (died 1901)
- Edward Fellowes, first Lord de Ramsey (died 1887)

On south side of chancel: Emma, relict of William Fellowes (died 1862)

The stained glass of the east window was given in memory of the Fellowes family.

In north aisle:

- James Smyth, surgeon (died 1848)
- Carina wife of Edward Day (died 1867)
- Coulson Churchill Fellowes (died in France in 1915)
- above is a standard of the Life Guards
- on east wall, James Jones, agent to the Fellowes estate (died 1803)
- on the west wall, Arthur Hubbard and Henry Flowers (died in the Second South African War, 1899–1902)

Windows in memory of:

- Private Leonard Fuller, Princess Patricia Canadian Light Infantry (died in Flanders, 1915)
- Harold Edward Langford (died at Kassassin, 1882)
- Heneage Greville, Lord Guernsey (died on the Aisne, 1914)

In south aisle:

- Lance Corporal Ronald William Shelton, Royal Fusiliers (died at Cambrai in 1918)
- Rev. James Saunderson Serjeant, MA (died 1882)
- Isabella Rebecca, wife of Captain HW Denison Adam (died 1904)
- tablet commemorating the gratitude of parishioners of Ramsey for restoration of the church by Edward Fellowes, in 1843–4
- on west wall, David Black, BA, 2nd Lieutenant Lancashire Fusiliers (died at Poonah, 1892)
- window to Christopher Mawdesley (died 1894), and Catherine Jane his wife (died 1895)

== Churchyard cross ==
In the churchyard east of the chancel is the shaft of the 14th-century churchyard cross, standing about 9 feet (2.7 m) high. Its head has been lost.

== Sources and further reading ==
- Pevsner, Nikolaus (1968). Bedfordshire and the County of Huntingdon and Peterborough. The Buildings of England. Harmondsworth: Penguin Books. pp. 332–334. ISBN 0-14-0710-34-5.
- RCHME, ed. (1926). An Inventory of the Historical Monuments in Huntingdonshire. London: His Majesty's Stationery Office. pp. 204–211.
