= Harlardus =

9th-century Bishop of Dorcester

- Bishop of Dorchester
- In office: between 869 and 888
- Predecessor: Ætla
- Successor: Wigmund

Orders
- Consecration: between 869 and 888

Personal details
- Died: between 893 and 896
- Denomination: Christian

Harlardus (or Alhheard or Eahlheard) was a medieval Bishop of Dorchester.

Harlardus was consecrated between 869 and 888 and died between 893 and 896.

== Citations ==
Christian titles
Preceded by Ætla	Bishop of Dorchester c. 878–c. 895	Succeeded by Wigmund
