= Hræthhun =

9th-century Bishop of Leicester

- Bishop of Leicester
- Appointed: between 814 and 816
- Term ended: between 839 and December 840
- Predecessor: Wernbeorht
- Successor: Ealdred

Orders
- Consecration: between 814 and 816

Personal details
- Died: between 839 and December 840
- Denomination: Christian

Hræthhun (or Rethhun or Hrethhun) Bishop of Leicester, died between 839 and December 840.

Hræthhun was consecrated bishop between 814 and 816. He was styled Abbot of Abingdon in a charter dated 811. However, this charter was found to be a forgery, and so Kelly (2000) excluded him from the list of abbots.

== Citations ==
Christian titles
Preceded by Wernbeorht	Bishop of Leicester c. 815 – c. 839	Succeeded by Ealdred
