= Æthelwold (bishop of Dorchester) =

10th-century Bishop of Dorcester

Æthelwald
- Bishop of Dorchester
- Appointed: between 934 and 945
- Term ended: between 949 and 950
- Predecessor: Wynsige
- Successor: Oskytel

Personal details
- Died: between 949 and 950
- Denomination: Christian

Æthelwald (floruit 934x945–949x950) was Bishop of Dorchester.

Æthelwald was consecrated between 934 and 945. He died between 949 and 950.

Æthelwald witnessed a number of charters under kings Edmund and Eadred. The date at which he became bishop is very uncertain, but it is reasonably sure that he died in about 950 when Bishop Oskytel begins to witness charters.

== Citations ==
Christian titles
Preceded by Wynsige	Bishop of Dorchester; 934x945–949x950	Succeeded by Oskytel
