= Torhthelm =

7th-century Bishop of Leicester

- Bishop of Leicester
- Installed: c. 737
- Term ended: 764 (death)
- Predecessor: Aldwine
- Successor: Eadbeorht

Orders
- Consecration: 737

Personal details
- Died: 764
- Denomination: Christian

Torhthelm was a medieval Bishop of Leicester in Mercia. He became bishop in 737 when Nothhelm, archbishop of Canterbury, divided a large see formerly held by Ealdwine in two. Torhthelm was responsible for the Middle Angles.

Torhthelm's date of birth is unknown. The location of his see is also unknown. Some sources say it was located in Leicester, but this is uncertain.

Torhthelm died in 764.

== Citations ==
Christian titles
Preceded by Aldwine	Bishop of Leicester; 737–764	Succeeded by Eadbeorht
