= Wernbeorht =

9th-century Bishop of Leicester

- Bishop of Leicester
- Appointed: between 801 and 803
- Term ended: between 814 and 816
- Predecessor: Unwona
- Successor: Hræthhun

Orders
- Consecration: between 801 and 803

Personal details
- Died: between 814 and 816
- Denomination: Christian

Wernbeorht (or Werenberht) was a medieval Bishop of Leicester.

Wernbeorht was consecrated between 801 and 803. He died between 814 and 816.

== Citations ==
Christian titles
Preceded by Unwona	Bishop of Leicester c. 802–c. 815	Succeeded by Hræthhun
