= Ælfhelm of Dorchester =

11th-century Bishop of Dorchester

Ælfhelm
- See: Bishop of Dorchester
- Term ended: between 1007 and 1007
- Predecessor: Ascwinus
- Successor: Eadnothus

Orders
- Consecration: 1002

Personal details
- Died: between 1007 and 1009
- Denomination: Christian

Ælfhelm was a medieval Bishop of Dorchester, when the town was seat of the united dioceses of Lindsey and Dorchester.

Ælfhelm was consecrated in 1002 and died between 1007 and 1009.

== Notes ==
Christian titles
Preceded by Ascwinus	Bishop of Dorchester; 1002–c. 1005	Succeeded by Eadnothus
