= Cholsey Abbey =

Abbey in Cholsey, Oxfordshire, England

Coordinates: 51.5788°N 1.1590°W

Cholsey Abbey was an Anglo-Saxon abbey in Cholsey in what is now the English county of Oxfordshire (formerly Berkshire), which was founded between 993 and 997 by King Æthelred the Unready on land which he had acquired from his mother, Ælfthryth. It was dedicated to Æthelred's half-brother, Edward the Martyr, and its first abbot was Germanus. It may have been sacked by the Vikings in 1006, and by the time of the Norman Conquest in 1066 it had disappeared.

== See also ==
- British History Online: Victoria County History of Berkshire: The Abbey of Reading (mentioning Cholsey Abbey)
