= Oswald of Worcester =

Archbishop of York from 972 to 992

Oswald
- Archbishop of York
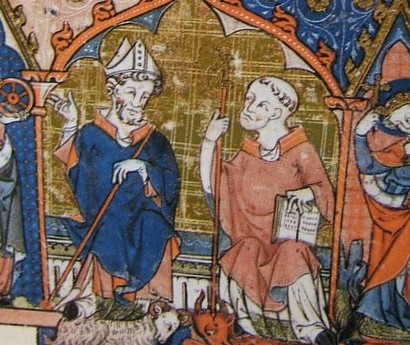
- Appointed: 972
- Term ended: 29 February 992
- Predecessor: Edwald
- Successor: Ealdwulf
- Other post: Bishop of Worcester

Orders
- Consecration: 961

Personal details
- Born: c. 925
- Died: 29 February 992 Worcester
- Buried: Worcester

Sainthood
- Feast day: 29 February (leap years); 28 February (common years); 19 May (POCSP)
- Venerated in: Eastern Orthodox Church; Catholic Church; Anglican Communion

Oswald of Worcester (c. 925 – 29 February 992) was Archbishop of York from 972 to his death in 992. He was of Danish ancestry, but brought up by his uncle, Oda of Canterbury, who sent him to France to the abbey of Fleury to become a monk. After a number of years at Fleury, Oswald returned to England at the request of his uncle, who died before Oswald returned. With his uncle's death, Oswald needed a patron and turned to another kinsman, Oskytel, who had recently become Archbishop of York. His activity for Oskytel attracted the notice of Archbishop Dunstan, who had Oswald consecrated as Bishop of Worcester in 961. In 972, Oswald was promoted to the see of York, although he continued to hold Worcester also.

As bishop and archbishop, Oswald was a supporter and one of the leading promoters (together with Æthelwold) of Dunstan's reforms of the church, including monastic reforms. Oswald founded a number of monasteries, including Ramsey Abbey, and reformed another seven, including Winchcombe in Gloucestershire and Pershore and Evesham in Worcestershire. Oswald also switched the cathedral chapter of Worcester from secular clergy to monks. While archbishop, he brought the scholar Abbo of Fleury to teach, and he spent two years in England, mostly at Ramsey. Oswald died in 992, while washing the feet of the poor. A hagiographical life was written shortly after his death, and he was quickly hailed as a saint.

== Early life ==
Oswald was born around 925 of Danish parentage. He was brought up by his uncle Oda, Archbishop of Canterbury, and related to Oskytel, later Archbishop of York and to the cniht Osulf, who received land while Oswald was bishop of Worcester. Oswald was instructed by a Frankish scholar Frithegod. He held the office of dean of Winchester, but he was sent by his uncle to France and entered the monastery of Fleury about 950, where he was ordained in 959. While at Fleury he met Osgar of Abingdon and Germanus of Winchester. The influence of Fleury was to be evident later in Oswald's life, when it was one of the inspirations for the Regularis Concordia, the English code of monastic conduct agreed to in 970.

== Return to England ==
Oswald returned to England in 958 at the behest of his uncle, but Oda died before Oswald returned. Lacking a patron, Oswald turned to Oskytel, recently named Archbishop of York. It is possible that Oswald, along with Oskytel, travelled to Rome for Oskytel's pallium, but this story is only contained in a 12th-century Ramsey Abbey chronicle, so it may not be authentic. Even if he did not travel to Rome, Oswald was active in ecclesiastical affairs at York until Dunstan obtained Oswald's appointment to the see, or bishopric, of Worcester. He was consecrated as Bishop of Worcester in 961. Soon after his consecration, he persuaded Germanus to come back to England and made him head of a small religious community near Westbury-on-Trym. After the establishment of this group about 962, Oswald grew worried that because the monastery was located on lands owned by the see of Worcester, his successors in the see might disrupt the community. He was offered the site of Ramsey Abbey in Huntingdonshire by Æthelwine, son of Æthelstan Half-King, and Oswald established a monastery there about 971 that attracted most of the members of the community at Westbury. This foundation at Ramsey went on to become Ramsey Abbey. Ramsey was Oswald's most famous foundation, with its church dedicated in 974. Later, Oswald invited Abbo of Fleury to come and teach at Ramsey. Oswald directed the affairs of Ramsey Abbey until his death, when the dean Eadnoth became the first abbot. He gave a magnificent Bible to Ramsey, which was important enough to merit a mention in Oswald's Life. Alongside the gift of the book, Oswald also contributed wall hangings and other textiles to the abbey.

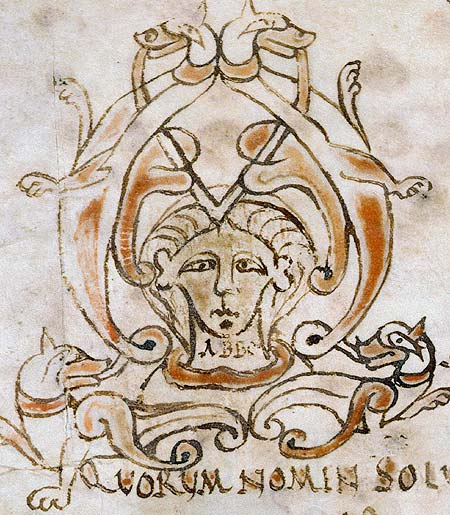
A medieval manuscript of Abbo of Fleury's work

Oswald supported Dunstan and Æthelwold, Bishop of Winchester, in their efforts to purify the Church from secularism. Aided by King Edgar, he took a prominent part in the revival of monastic discipline along the precepts of the Rule of Saint Benedict. His methods differed from Æthelwold's, who often violently ejected secular clergy from churches and replaced them with monks. Oswald also organised the estates of his see into administrative hundreds known as the Oswaldslow, which helped stabilise the ecclesiastical revenues. He constantly visited the monasteries he founded, and was long remembered as the father of his people both as bishop and archbishop. It was Oswald who changed the cathedral chapter of Worcester from priests to monks, although the exact method that he employed is unclear. One tradition says that Oswald used a slow approach in building up a new church of monks next to the cathedral, allowing the cathedral's priests to continue performing services in the cathedral until the monastic foundation was strong enough to take over the cathedral. Another tradition claims that, instead, Oswald expelled any of the clergy in the cathedral that would not give up their wives and replaced them with monks immediately. Oswald also reformed Winchcombe Abbey, along with the monasteries of Westbury Priory, Pershore Abbey, and Evesham Abbey. It is also possible that monasteries were established in Gloucester and Deerhurst, but evidence is lacking for their exact foundation dates.

== Archbishop of York ==
In 972, Oswald was made Archbishop of York and journeyed to Rome to receive a pallium from Pope John XIII. It is possible that he also travelled on Edgar's behalf to the court of the Emperor Otto I, and that these two journeys had been combined. He continued to hold the see of Worcester in addition to York. The holding of Worcester, in addition to York, became traditional for almost the next fifty years. Although it was uncanonical, it had many advantages for York in that it added a much richer diocese to their holdings, and one which was more peaceful as well. When Edgar died in 975, Ælfhere, Ealdorman of Mercia, broke up many monastic communities, some of which were Oswald's foundations. Ramsey, however, was not disturbed, probably due to the patronage of Æthelwine, Ealdorman of East Anglia, son of Æthelstan Half-King. Ælfhere was a supporter of Ethelred the Unready, the son of Edgar's third marriage, while Oswald supported the son of Edgar's first marriage, Edward the Martyr, in the dispute over who would succeed King Edgar.

In 985, Oswald invited Abbo of Fleury to come to Ramsey to help found the monastic school there. Abbo was at Ramsey from 985 to 987, where he taught computus, or the methods for calculating Easter. It was also often used in trying to calculate the date of the Last Judgment. A surviving manuscript gives a list compiled by Oswald, setting forth estates that had been taken from the diocese of York.

== Death and sainthood ==
Oswald died on 29 February 992 in the act of washing the feet of the poor at Worcester, as was his daily custom during Lent, and was buried in the Church of St Mary at Worcester. He promoted the education of the clergy and persuaded scholars to come from Fleury and teach in England. A Life of Oswald was written after his death, probably by Byrhtferth, a monk of Ramsey Abbey. Two manuscripts, a psalter (Harley MS 2904 in the British Library) and a pontifical (MS 100, part 2 from Sidney Sussex College of Cambridge University), probably belonged to Oswald and would have been used in his daily devotions.

Almost immediately after his death, miracles were reported at his funeral and at his tomb. His remains were translated to a different burial spot in Worcester Cathedral ten years after his death. His feast day is celebrated on 28 February or on 19 May in the Personal Ordinariate of the Chair of Saint Peter.

== Citations ==
Christian titles
Preceded by Dunstan	Bishop of Worcester; 961–?	Succeeded by Ealdwulf
Preceded by Edwald	Archbishop of York; 971–992	Succeeded by Ealdwulf
