= Bishop of Lincoln =

Diocesan bishop in the Church of England

- Bishopric

anglican
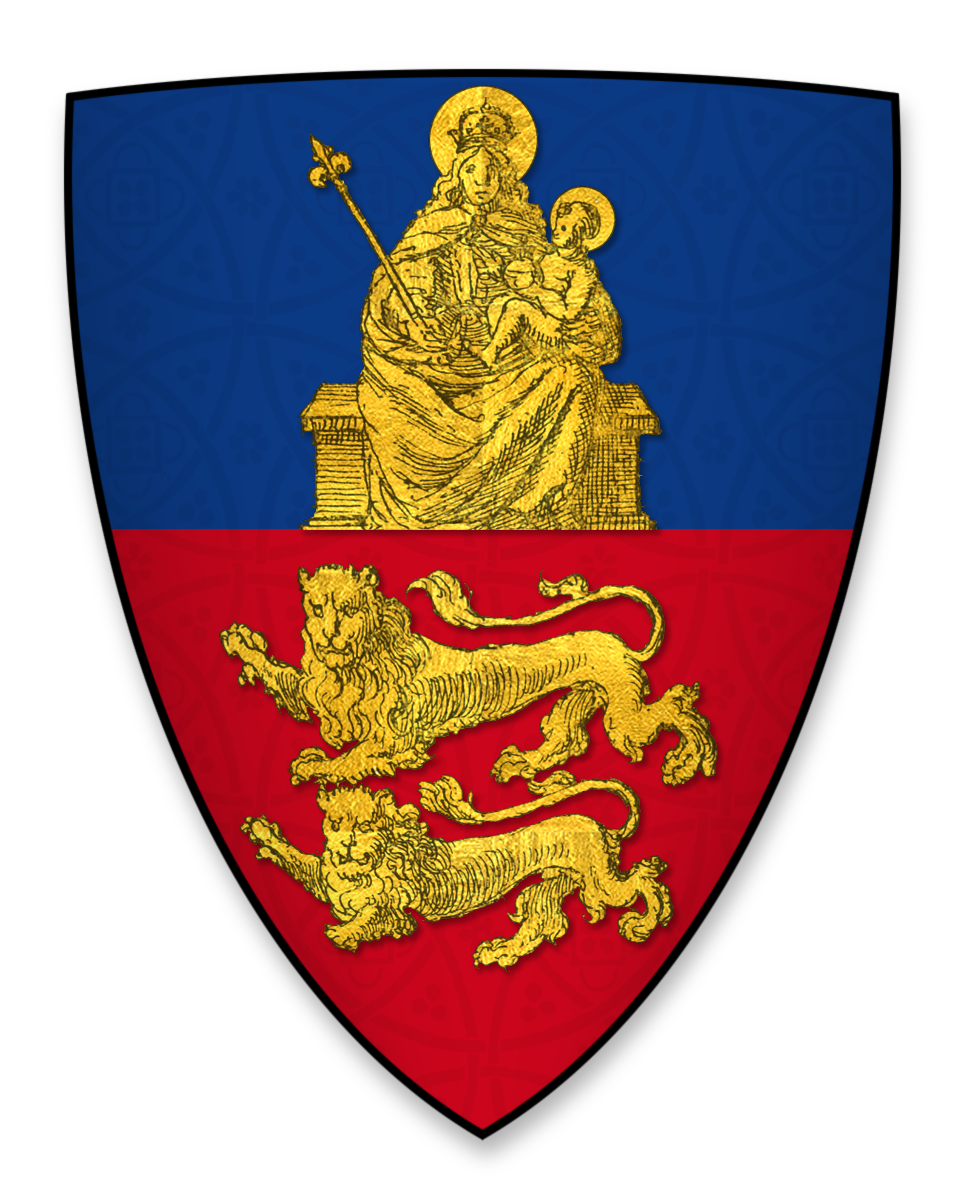
- Arms of the Diocese of Lincoln: Gules, two lions passant guardant or on a chief azure the Virgin ducally crowned sitting on a throne issuant from the chief on her dexter arm the infant Jesus and in her sinister hand a sceptre all or
- Incumbent vacant

Location
- Ecclesiastical province: Canterbury
- Residence: Bishop's Palace, Lincoln (medieval & 19th century – 1948); Buckden Palace (12th century – 1841); Riseholme Hall (1843–1888); Bishop's House, Lincoln (1948–2011); 5-bed house (since 2011)

Information
- First holder: Cuthwine of Leicester; Remigius de Fécamp (first Bishop of Lincoln)
- Diocese: Lincoln
- Cathedral: Leicester (7th–9th centuries); Dorchester Abbey (9th–11th c.); Lincoln Cathedral (since 1072)

Website
- lincoln.anglican.org

The Bishop of Lincoln is the ordinary (diocesan bishop) of the Church of England Diocese of Lincoln in the Province of Canterbury.

The present diocese covers the county of Lincolnshire and the unitary authority areas of North Lincolnshire and North East Lincolnshire. The bishop's seat (cathedra) is located in the Cathedral Church of the Blessed Virgin Mary in the city of Lincoln. The cathedral was originally a minster church founded around 653 and refounded as a cathedral in 1072. Until the 1530s the bishops were in full communion with the Roman Catholic Church.

The medieval Bishop's Palace lies immediately to the south of the cathedral in Palace Yard; managed by English Heritage, it is open to visitors. A later residence (first used by Bishop Edward King in 1885) on the same site was converted from office accommodation to reopen in 2009 as a 16-bedroom conference centre and wedding venue. It is now known as Edward King House and provides offices for the bishops, archdeacons and diocesan staff. A 14-bedroom house (Bishop's House) on Eastgate was the official residence in use from 1948 until 2011, when the bishop's office staff and home were separated, allowing the incoming bishop, Christopher Lowson, to live in a modern five-bedroom house. A further residence of the mediaeval Bishops of Lincoln was Banbury Castle, built in 1135 by Alexander of Lincoln, Bishop of Lincoln and retained by the see until 1547.

== History ==
850–925

950–1035

The dioceses of Anglo-Saxon England 850–1035

The Anglo-Saxon dioceses of Lindsey and Leicester were established when the large Diocese of Mercia was divided in the late 7th century into the bishoprics of Lichfield and Leicester (for Mercia itself), Worcester (for the Hwicce), Hereford (for the Magonsæte) and Lindsey (for the Lindisfaras). The historic Bishop of Dorchester was a prelate who administered the Diocese of Dorchester in the Anglo-Saxon period. The bishop's seat, or cathedra, was at the cathedral in Dorchester-on-Thames in Oxfordshire.

In the 660s the seat at Dorchester-on-Thames was abandoned, but briefly in the late 670s it was once more a bishop's seat under Ætla, under Mercian control. The town of Dorchester again became the seat of a bishop in around 875, when the Mercian Bishop of Leicester transferred his seat there. The diocese merged with that of Lindsey in 971; the bishop's seat was moved to Lincoln in 1072 and thus the Mercian Bishops of Dorchester were succeeded by the Bishops of Lincoln.

The first bishops of Leicester were originally prelates who administered an Anglo-Saxon diocese between the 7th and 9th centuries. The bishopric fell victim to the invasion by the Danes and the episcopal see was transferred to Dorchester-on-Thames in Oxfordshire.

The dioceses of Lindsey and Leicester continued until the Danish Viking invasions and establishment of the Danelaw in the 9th century. The see of Leicester was transferred to Dorchester, now in Oxfordshire, sometime between 869 and 888. After an interruption, the see of Lindsey was resumed until it was united with the bishopric of Dorchester in the early 11th century. The diocese was the largest in England, extending from the River Thames to the Humber Estuary.

In 1072, Remigius de Fécamp moved the see of Dorchester to Lincoln, but the bishops of Lincoln retained significant landholdings within Oxfordshire. Because of this historic link, for a long time Banbury remained a "peculiar" of the Bishop of Lincoln.

Until the 1530s the bishops were in full communion with the Roman Catholic Church. During the English Reformation they changed their allegiance back and forth between the crown and the papacy. Under Henry VIII and Edward VI, the bishops conformed to the Church of England, but under Mary I they adhered to the Roman Catholic Church. Since the English Reformation, the bishops and diocese of Lincoln have been part of the reformed Church of England, and the Anglican Communion.

The dioceses of Oxford and Peterborough were created in 1541, out of parts of the Diocese of Lincoln. The county of Leicestershire was transferred from Lincoln to Peterborough in 1837.

== List of bishops of Lincoln ==
=== Pre-Reformation bishops ===
Bishops of Leicester
From	Until	Incumbent	Notes
679	c.691	Cuthwine	
692	705	Wilfrid	Translated from York; later transferred to Hexham
709	c.716/727	Headda	also Bishop of Lichfield
c.716/727	737	Aldwine	also Bishop of Lichfield
737	764	Torhthelm	
764	c.781/785	Eadbeorht	
c.781/785	c.801/803	Unwona	
c.801/803	c.814/816	Wernbeorht	
c.814/816	839 or 840	Hræthhun	
839 or 840	c.840/844	Ealdred	
c.840/844	c.869/888	Ceolred	
In the late 9th century, the episcopal see of Leicester was moved to Dorchester.
Bishops of Dorchester
From	Until	Incumbent	Notes
betw. 869 x 888	betw. 893 x 896	Harlardus	Also recorded as Alhheard; Eahlheard.
betw. 893 x 900	betw. 903 x 909	Wigmund	or Wilferth
c. 909	betw. 909 x 925	Coenwulf	Also recorded as Kenulphus
betw. 909 x 925	betw. 934 x 945	Wynsige	
betw. 934 x 945	betw. 949 x 950	Æthelwold	
949 or 950	971	Oscytel	Also Archbishop of York (956–971).
971	betw. 971 x 975	Leofwine	Bishop of Lindsey; united the sees of Dorchester and of Lindsey in 971, bishops of the united diocese known as Bishop of Dorchester
betw. 971 x 975	betw. 975 x 979	Alnothus	Also recorded as Alfnoth
betw. 975 x 979	23 April 1002	Æscwig	Also recorded as Œswy; Ascwinus.
1002	betw. 1007 x 1009	Ælfhelm	Also recorded as Alfhelmus.
betw. 1007 x 1009	18 October 1016	Eadnoth (I.)	Also recorded as Eadnothus. Abbot of Ramsey; killed at the battle of Assandun.
1016	8 December 1034	Æthelric	Also recorded as Eadhericus; Brihtmær.
1034	18/19 September 1049	Eadnoth (II.)	Also recorded as Eadnothus. Bishop of Dorchester, Leicester, and Lindey.
1049	14 September 1052	Ulfus Normanus	Also recorded as Ulf. Royal priest; suspended at the Council of Vercelli 1050; expelled
1053	1067	Wulfwig	Also recorded as Wulfinus. Royal priest.
1067	1072	Remigius de Fécamp	Also recorded as Remigius de Feschamp. Moved the see to Lincoln

Pre-Reformation Bishops of Lincoln
From	Until	Incumbent	Notes
1072	1092	Remigius de Fécamp	Formerly Almoner of Fécamp, Normandy; consecrated Bishop of Dorchester (possibly in 1067); transferred the see from Dorchester to Lincoln in 1072; died in office 8 May 1092; also known as Remigius de Feschamp
1093	1123	Robert Bloet	Formerly Lord Chancellor 1092–1093; nominated bishop in March 1093 and consecrated before 22 February 1094; died in office 10 January 1123; also known as Robert Bluet
1123	1148	Alexander	Formerly Archdeacon of Salisbury; nominated bishop in April and consecrated 22 July 1123; died in office 20 February 1148
1148	1166	Robert de Chesney	Elected bishop 13 December and consecrated 19 December 1148; died in office 27 December 1166; also known as Robert de Cheney alias Querceto
1168	1173	See vacant	
1173	1182	Geoffrey Plantagenet	Elected bishop circa May 1173 and confirmed before July 1175; resigned without being consecrated 6 January 1182; later became Archbishop of York in 1189
1183	1184	Walter de Coutances	Formerly Archdeacon of Oxford; elected bishop 8 May and consecrated 3 July 1183; translated to Rouen in the summer of 1184; also known as Walter de Coutances, Walter of Coutances, or Walter of Rouen
1184	1186	See vacant	
1186	1200	Hugh of Avalon	Formerly Prior of Witham Charterhouse; elected bishop 25 May and consecrated 21 September 1186; installed at Lincoln Cathedral 29 September 1181; died in office 16 November 1200; canonised in 1220; also known as Saint Hugh of Lincoln
1200	1203	See vacant	
1203	1206	William de Blois	Formerly Prebendary of Lincoln; elected bishop before 6 July and consecrated 24 August 1203; died in office 10 May 1206
1206	1209	See vacant	
1209	1235	Hugh of Wells	Formerly Archdeacon of Wells; elected bishop before 14 April and consecrated 20 December 1209; in exile until 1213 due to Pope Innocent III's interdict against King John's England; died in office 7 February 1235; also known as Hugh Troteman
1235	1253	Robert Grosseteste	Formerly Archdeacon of Leicester; elected bishop 25 March and consecrated 17 June 1235; died before 9 October 1253; also known as Robert Grosthead or Robert Grouthed
1254	1258	Henry of Lexington	Formerly Dean of Lincoln; elected bishop 21 or 30 December 1253 and consecrated 17 May 1254; died in office 8 August 1258
1258	1279	Richard of Gravesend	Formerly Dean of Lincoln; elected bishop 21 or 23 September and consecrated 3 November 1258; died in office 18 December 1279; also known as Richard de Gravesend
1280	1299	Oliver Sutton	Formerly Dean of Lincoln; elected bishop 6 February and consecrated 19 May 1280; died in office 13 November 1299
1300	1320	John Dalderby	Formerly Chancellor of Lincoln; elected bishop 15 January and consecrated 12 June 1300; died in office 12 January 1320; also known as John Aldberry or John d'Aldreby
1320		(Anthony Bek)	Elected bishop 3 February 1320, but was quashed later in the same year; became Bishop of Norwich in 1337
1320	1340	Henry Burghersh	Appointed 27 May and consecrated 20 July 1320; also was Lord Treasurer 1327–1328 and Lord Chancellor 1328–1330; died before 27 December 1340
1341	1347	Thomas Bek	Elected bishop before 1 March 1341 and consecrated 7 July 1342; died in office 2 February 1347; also known as Thomas le Bec
1347	1363	John Gynwell	Formerly Archdeacon of Northampton; appointed bishop and consecrated 23 September 1342; died in office 5 August 1362; also known as John Gyndell, John Gyndwelle or John Sinwell
1363	1398	John Bokyngham	Formerly Keeper of the Privy Seal 1360–1363; elected bishop sometime between 20 August and 4 October 1362; appointed 5 April and consecrated 25 June 1363; resigned sometime between March and July 1398; died 10 March 1399; also known as John Buckingham
1398	1404	Henry Beaufort	Chancellor of the University of Oxford and Dean of Wells; appointed 27 February and consecrated 14 July 1398; also was Lord Chancellor; translated to Winchester 19 November 1404 where later created a Cardinal in 1426.
1404	1419	Philip Repyngdon	Formerly Abbot of Leicester and Chancellor of the University of Oxford; appointed bishop 19 November 1404 and consecrated 29 March 1405; created a Cardinal 19 September 1408 but revoked in 1409; resigned 21 November 1419; died 1424; also known as Philip de Repingdon.
1420	1431	Richard Fleming	Formerly a Canon of Lincoln; appointed 20 November 1419 and consecrated 28 April 1420; he was appointed archbishop of York 14 February 1424, but resigned the appointment 20 July 1425; continued as bishop of Lincoln until died 25 January 1431; also known as Richard Fleyming
1431	1436	William Grey	Translated from London; appointed 30 April 1431; died in office sometime between 10 and 18 February 1436; also known as William Gray
1437	1450	William Alnwick	Translated from Norwich; appointed 19 September 1437; died in office 5 December 1449; also known as William Alnewick
1450		Marmaduke Lumley	Translated from Carlisle; appointed 28 January 1450; died in office 1 December 1450
1450	1452	See vacant	
1452	1472	John Chadworth	Formerly Provost of King's College, Cambridge; elected bishop before 11 February 1451 and consecrated 18 June 1452; died 23 June 1471; also known as John Chedworth
1472	1480	Thomas Rotherham	Translated from Rochester; appointed 8 January 1472; also was Keeper of the Privy Seal and Lord Chancellor; translated to York 7 July 1480; also known as Thomas de Rotherham, or Thomas Scot
1480	1494	John Russell	Translated from Rochester; appointed 7 July 1480; died in office 30 December 1494
1495	1514	William Smyth	Translated from Bishop of Coventry and Lichfield; appointed 6 November 1495; died in office 2 January 1514
1514	1515	Thomas Wolsey	Formerly Dean of Lincoln 1509–1514 and York 1513–1514; appointed bishop of Lincoln 6 February and consecrated 26 March 1514; translated to archbishopric of York 15 September 1514
1514	1521	William Atwater	Appointed 15 September and consecrated 12 November 1514; died in office 4 February 1521

=== Bishops during the Reformation ===
Bishops of Lincoln during the Reformation
From	Until	Incumbent	Notes
1521	1547	John Longland	Formerly Dean of Salisbury 1514–1521; appointed bishop 20 March and consecrated 5 May 1521; died in office 7 May 1547
1547	1551	Henry Holbeach	Translated from Rochester; nominated 1 August and confirmed 20 August 1547; died in office 6 August 1551
1552	1554	John Taylor	Nominated 18 June and consecrated 26 June 1552; deprived of the see 15 March 1554; died in December 1554
1554	1556	John White	Nominated before 1 April 1554 and consecrated on that date; translated to Winchester 6 July 1556
1557	1559	Thomas Watson	Nominated 7 December 1556; appointed 24 May and consecrated 15 August 1557; deprived of the see 26 June 1559; died in September 1584

=== Post-Reformation bishops ===
Post-Reformation Bishops of Lincoln
From	Until	Incumbent	Notes
1560	1571	Nicholas Bullingham	Nominated 25 November 1559 and consecrated 21 January 1560; translated to Worcester 26 January 1571
1571	1584	Thomas Cooper	Nominated 15 January and consecrated 24 February 1571; translated to Winchester 23 March 1584
1584	1595	William Wickham	Nominated 28 October and consecrated 6 December 1584; translated to Winchester 22 February 1595
1595	1608	William Chaderton	Translated from Chester; nominated before 28 March and confirmed 24 May 1595; died in office 11 April 1608
1608	1613	William Barlow	Translated from Rochester; elected bishop of Lincoln 21 May and confirmed 27 June 1608; died in office 7 September 1613
1614	1617	Richard Neile	Translated from Lichfield; elected bishop of Lincoln 17 January and confirmed 18 February 1614; translated to Durham 9 October 1617
1617	1621	George Montaigne	Elected bishop 21 October and consecrated 14 December 1617; translated to London 20 July 1621; also known as George Mountain
1621	1641	John Williams	Elected bishop 3 August and consecrated 11 November 1621; also was Lord Keeper 1621–1625 (the last cleric to hold the position); translated to York in December 1641
1641	1646	Thomas Winniffe	Nominated 17 December 1641 and consecrated 6 February 1642; deprived of the see when the English episcopacy was abolished by Parliament on 9 October 1646; after November 1646, he retired to Lambourne; died 19 September 1654
1646	1660	The see was abolished during the Commonwealth and the Protectorate.	
1660	1663	Robert Sanderson	Nominated 3 October and consecrated 28 October 1660; died in office 29 January 1663
1663	1667	Benjamin Lany	Translated from Peterborough; nominated 20 February and consecrated 2 April 1663; translated to Ely 12 June 1667
1667	1675	William Fuller	Translated from Limerick, Ardfert and Aghadoe; nominated 5 September and confirmed 27 September 1667; died in office 22 April 1675
1675	1691	Thomas Barlow	Nominated 1 May and consecrated 27 June 1675; died in office 8 October 1691
1691	1695	Thomas Tenison	Nominated 27 October 1691 and consecrated 10 January 1692; translated to Canterbury 16 January 1695
1695	1705	James Gardiner	Nominated 18 January and consecrated 10 March 1695; died in office 1 March 1705
1705	1716	William Wake	Nominated 16 July and consecrated 21 October 1705; translated to Canterbury 16 January 1716
1716	1723	Edmund Gibson	Nominated 17 December 1715 and consecrated 12 February 716; translated to London 4 May 1723
1723	1743	Richard Reynolds	Translated from Bangor; nominated 16 May and confirmed 10 June 1723; died in office 15 January 1744
1744	1761	John Thomas	Formerly Bishop-elect of St Asaph; nominated 20 January and consecrated 1 April 1744; translated to Salisbury 25 November 1761
1761	1779	John Green	Nominated 28 November and consecrated 28 December 1761; died in office 25 April 1779
1779	1787	Thomas Thurlow	Nominated 5 May and consecrated 30 May 1779; translated to Durham 19 February 1787
1787	1820	George Pretyman (later Pretyman Tomline)	Nominated 19 February and consecrated 11 March 1787; changed his surname to Pretyman Tomline in June 1803; translated to Winchester 18 August 1820
1820	1827	The Hon George Pelham	Translated from Exeter; nominated 18 August and confirmed 16 October 1820; died in office 7 February 1827
1827	1853	John Kaye	Translated from Bristol; nominated 12 February and confirmed 1 March 1827; died in office 19 February 1853
1853	1869	John Jackson	Nominated 18 March and consecrated 5 May 1853; translated to London 11 January 1869
1869	1885	Christopher Wordsworth	Nominated 9 February and consecrated 24 February 1869; resigned in February 1885; died 20 March 1885
1885	1910	Edward King	Nominated 5 March and consecrated 25 April 1885; died in office 8 March 1910
1910	1919	Edward Hicks	Nominated 28 April and consecrated 24 June 1910; died in office 14 August 1919
1919	1932	William Swayne	Nominated 26 November 1919 and consecrated 6 January 1920; resigned 14 November 1932; died 30 June 1941
1933	1942	Nugent Hicks	Translated from Gibraltar; nominated 12 December 1932 and confirmed 15 February 1933; died in office 10 February 1942
1942	1946	Aylmer Skelton	Translated from Bedford; nominated 27 July and confirmed 27 August 1942; resigned 1 May 1946; died 30 August 1959
1946	1947	Leslie Owen	Translated from Maidstone; nominated 12 June and confirmed 17 July 1946; died in office 2 March 1947
1947	1956	Maurice Harland	Translated from Croydon; nominated 22 May and confirmed 11 July 1947; translated to Durham 7 July 1956
1956	1974	Kenneth Riches	Translated from Dorchester; nominated 24 August and confirmed 26 September 1956; resigned 30 September 1974; died 15 May 1999.
1974	1986	Simon Phipps	Translated from Horsham; nominated 7 October 1974 and confirmed 2 January 1975; retired in 1986; died 29 January 2001.
1987	2002	Robert Hardy	Translated from Maidstone; nominated and confirmed in 1987; retired in 2002; died 9 April 2021.
2001/2	2011	John Saxbee	Translated from Ludlow; nominated 4 September 2001, election confirmed late December 2001/early January 2002 and installed at Lincoln Cathedral 23 March 2002; retired 2011
2011	2021	Christopher Lowson	former national Director of Ministry; enthroned 15 November 2011; suspended 16 May 2019 – 1 February 2021; retired 31 December 2021
2019	2021	David Court, Bishop of Grimsby	Acting bishop during Lowson's suspension; and during the vacancy, 1 May 2023 to present
2023	2023	David Court, Bishop of Grimsby	Acting bishop during Lowson's suspension; and during the vacancy, 1 May 2023 to present
2023	present	Stephen Conway	Translating from Ely, "autumn" 2023; previously half-time Acting Bishop of Lincoln (while also Bishop of Ely), 1 January 2022 – 30 April 2023. Resigned 21 September 2026.

== Assistant bishops ==
Among those who have served as assistant bishops of the diocese have been:

- 1930 – 1934 (d.): John Hine, Archdeacon of Lincoln (until 1933) and former Bishop of Likoma, of Zanzibar, of Northern Rhodesia and of Grantham
- 1950 – 1964 (ret.): Colin Dunlop, Dean of Lincoln and former Bishop suffragan of Jarrow

Honorary assistant bishops, serving after their retirements, have included:

- 1968 – 1977 (d.): George Clarkson, retired Dean of Guildford and former Bishop suffragan-Archdeacon of Pontefract
- 1995 – 2016 (d.): Donald Snelgrove, retired Bishop of Hull
- 1995 – 2011 (d.): John Brown, retired Bishop in Cyprus and the Gulf
- 2001–present: David Tustin, retired Bishop of Grimsby

== Sources ==
- Kirby, D. P. (2000). The Earliest English Kings. New York: Routledge. ISBN 0-415-24211-8.
