= Æscwig of Dorchester =

10th-century Bishop of Dorchester

Æscwig
- See: Bishop of Dorchester
- Term ended: 23 April 1002
- Predecessor: Alnothus
- Successor: Alfhelmus

Orders
- Consecration: between 975 and 979

Personal details
- Died: 1002
- Denomination: Christian

Æscwig (or Œswy) was a medieval Bishop of Dorchester, when the town was seat of the united dioceses of Lindsey and Dorchester.

Æscwig was a monk at Winchester and then abbot of Bath. In 973 he was sent by King Edgar on an embassy to Germany, and information he learnt there about Ottonian royal ritual may have played a part in the planning of Edgar's coronation. In old age, he was chosen to lead a sea-fyrd against the Danes in 992.

Æscwig was consecrated between 975 and 979 and died on 23 April 1002.

== Citations ==
Christian titles
Preceded by Alnothus	Bishop of Dorchester c. 977–1002	Succeeded by Alfhelmus
