= Alnothus =

10th-century Bishop of Dorchester

- See: Bishop of Dorchester
- Term ended: between 975 and 979
- Predecessor: Leofwine, Bishop of Lincoln
- Successor: Ascwinus

Orders
- Consecration: between 971 and 975

Personal details
- Died: between 975 and 979
- Denomination: Christian

Alnothus (Note: Or Alfnoth or Ælfnoth) was a medieval Bishop of Dorchester, when the town was seat of the united dioceses of Lindsey and Dorchester.

Alnothus was consecrated between 971 and 975 and died between 975 and 979.

== Citations ==
Religious titles
Preceded by Leofwine	Bishop of Dorchester c. 970–c. 977	Succeeded by Ascwinus
