= Wigmund (bishop of Dorchester) =

9th and 10th-century Bishop of Dorcester

- Bishop of Dorchester
- See: Diocese of Dorchester
- Appointed: between 893 and 900
- Term ended: between 903 and 909
- Predecessor: Harlardus
- Successor: Coenwulf

Orders
- Consecration: between 893 and 900

Personal details
- Died: between 903 and 909
- Denomination: Christian

Wigmund was a medieval Bishop of Dorchester.

Wigmund was consecrated between 893 and 900 and died between 903 and 909.

There is some confusion between Wigmund and another bishop, Wilferth, reportedly the bishop of Lichfield. The surviving charters do not explicitly specify which was bishop of where; therefore, it may have been Wilferth who was bishop of Dorchester, and Wigmund the bishop of Lichfield.

== Citations ==
Christian titles
Preceded by Harlardus	Bishop of Dorchester c. 896–c. 906	Succeeded by Coenwulf
