= Winchcombe Abbey =

Former Benedictine monastery in Gloucestershire, England

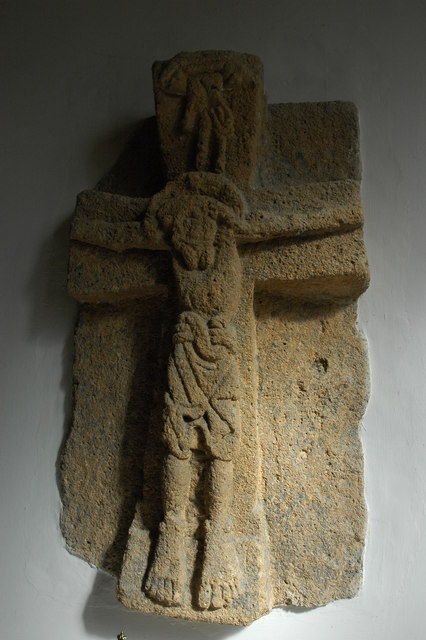
- Saxon stone cross dating to 1020-1050 in St Catherine's Church, Wormington. It is thought to have originated from Winchcombe Abbey.
- Interactive map of Winchcombe Abbey

Monastery information
- Full name: Monastery of St. Mary at Winchcombe
- Order: Benedictine
- Established: 798
- Disestablished: 1539.

Scheduled monument
- Official name: Winchcombe Abbey
- Designated: 18 October 1962
- Reference no.: 1019146
- Reestablished: 970
- Dedication: St. Mary
- Consecrated: 811

People
- Founder: King Coenwulf of Mercia
- Abbot: First: Livingus; After Reestablishment: Germanus of Winchester; Last: Richard Ancelme

Site
- Location: Winchcombe, Gloucestershire
- Coordinates: 51°57′12″N 1°58′1″W
- Visible remains: The main abbey is now gone, however the attached Parish Church of St. Peter is in active use
- Public access: Inaccessible

Winchcombe Abbey is a now-vanished Benedictine abbey in Winchcombe, Gloucestershire; this abbey was once in the heart of Mercia, an Anglo Saxon kingdom at the time of the Heptarchy in England. The Abbey was founded c. 798 for three hundred Benedictine monks, by King Offa of Mercia or King Coenwulf of Mercia. In its time, it was the burial place of two members of the Mercian ruling class, the aforementioned Coenwulf and his son Cynehelm, later venerated as Saint Kenelm.

According to more recent research, the original foundation by Offa in 787 was for a community of nuns, to which Coenwulf added a community of men in 811 to create a double monastery. The nunnery ceased to exist sometime after 897.

The abbey was refounded in 970 after the disruptions of the Danish invasions, and the first abbot of the new establishment was Germanus of Winchester.

The abbey itself was in the grounds to the east end of the parish church of St Kenelm. Many pilgrims visited St Kenelm's tomb in the Early Middle Ages, and the Abbey thus became very rich. At its heyday, Winchcombe Abbey alone owned 25,300 acres (102 km^{2}) in 13 parishes. Indeed, Snowshill Manor was owned by Winchcombe Abbey from 821 until the Dissolution of the Monasteries. In the early sixteenth century Winchcombe Abbey was known as a centre of learning under Abbot Richard Kidderminster (1488–1527), who was also a renowned preacher and acted as an ambassador for Henry VII. The quality of the stonemasons at Winchcombe was known to be very high, and it was a Winchcombe master mason who built the Divinity School at Oxford.

Winchcombe Abbey was surrendered to the Crown and then demolished in 1539. Some of its stones can still be found in Winchcombe; for example the lintel over the abbey gate now rests over the gate of what was once the George Inn. Fragments of the abbey can still be seen in various places in Winchcombe, notably the Corner Cupboard Inn on the Cheltenham road.

It is believed that Edmund Brydges, 2nd Baron Chandos used the ruins as a quarry during his redevelopment of Sudeley Castle in the 1570s; a collection of abbey stone that was retrieved from the castle gardens are displayed in its dungeons.

A stone cross was erected in the 19th century to mark the centre of the abbey tower. Very little now remains of the Abbey; more remains of its great nearby rival, Hailes Abbey.

== Timeline for Winchcombe Abbey ==
- 798 – King Kenulf of Mercia gives instructions for building an abbey
- 811 – Winchcombe Abbey is dedicated by Wulfred, Archbishop of Canterbury
- 1042–1066 – During Edward the Confessor's reign Winchcombe Abbey becomes one of the most powerful Benedictine monasteries in the country
- 29 August 1151 – Fire destroys much of Winchcombe, including the Abbey
- 1239 – Re-building of the Abbey completed
- 23 December 1539 – Winchcombe Abbey is surrendered to the crown and the monks are pensioned off. The Abbey buildings are quickly demolished the stone being re-used in other buildings

== See also ==
- List of monastic houses in Gloucestershire
- List of abbeys and priories in England
