= Edwald =

Archbishop of York in 971

- Archbishop of York
- Appointed: 971
- Term ended: resigned 971
- Predecessor: Oscytel
- Successor: Oswald

Orders
- Consecration: 971

Edwald (or Edwaldus) was Archbishop of York for a time in the year 971. He resigned the see only months after his election.

== Citations ==
Christian titles
Preceded by Oscytel	Archbishop of York; 971	Succeeded by Oswald
