= Coenwulf of Dorchester =

10th-century Bishop of Dorcester

Coenwulf
- Bishop of Dorchester
- Appointed: c. 909
- Term ended: between 909 and 925
- Predecessor: Ceolredus
- Successor: Wynsige

Orders
- Consecration: c. 909

Personal details
- Died: between 909 and 925
- Denomination: Christian

Coenwulf (or Cenwulf) was a medieval Bishop of Dorchester.

Coenwulf was consecrated around 909 and died between 909 and 925.

== Citations ==
Christian titles
Preceded by Wigmund	Bishop of Dorchester c. 909–c. 917	Succeeded by Wynsige
