= Wulfwig =

11th-century Bishop of Dorchester

- See: Bishop of Dorchester
- Term ended: 1067
- Predecessor: Ulfus Normanus
- Successor: Remigius de Fécamp

Orders
- Consecration: 1053

Personal details
- Died: 1067
- Denomination: Catholic

Wulfwig (Wulfinus) was a medieval Bishop of Dorchester, when the town was seat of the united dioceses of Lindsey and Dorchester. He was one of the last Anglo-Saxon bishops following the Norman Conquest.

== Life ==
Wulfwig appears in a charter of 1045 as royal chancellor, but its reliability of doubtful. In 1053 he succeeded Ulf in the bishopric of Dorchester. His predecessor was living and had been irregularly deprived, and Freeman suggests that the record of this fact in the chronicle may indicate some feeling against Wulfwig's appointment, but there seems to have been no opposition. Wulfwig apparently shared the scruple about the canonical position of Archbishop Stigand, for he went abroad to be consecrated. His appointment is thought to mark a momentary decline in Norman influence, and he was the last of the old line of Dorchester bishops, for his death occurred when the English ecclesiastical preferments were passing into Norman hands. His will is extant and is witnessed by a large number of persons, beginning with the king.

Wulfwig was consecrated in 1053 on the continent. and died in 1067. He was buried in Dorchester.

== Citations ==
Christian titles
| Preceded by Ulfus Normanus | Bishop of Dorchester; 1053–1067 | Succeeded by Remigius de Fécamp |
