= Ætla =

7th-century Bishop of Dorchester

- Bishops of Dorchester
- Church: Christian
- In office: c. 660

Ætla, who lived in the 7th century, is believed to be one of many Bishops of Dorchester during the Anglo-Saxon period. The village of Attlebridge, Norfolk is named after him, as he is credited for the construction of a bridge ('brycg' in Old English) there.

Ætla was attested about 660. In the 670s, the seat of his bishopric was at Dorchester-on-Thames, which was then under Mercian control. He does not seem to have had any comparable predecessors or successors in that see.

== Early life ==
Details regarding Ætla's early life are sparse. The venerable historian Bede's writings indicate a comparatively short duration of his existence. Prior to assuming the mantle of bishop, Ætla pursued a monastic vocation within the Northumbrian Monastery of Whitby.
