= Eadnoth II =

11th-century Bishop of Dorchester

- See: Bishop of Dorchester
- Term ended: 18 or 19 September 1049
- Predecessor: Eadhericus
- Successor: Ulfus Normanus

Orders
- Consecration: 1034

Personal details
- Died: 18 or 19 September 1049
- Denomination: Christian

Eadnoth II (or Eadnothus II) was a medieval Bishop of Dorchester, when the town was seat of the united dioceses of Lindsey and Dorchester.

Eadnoth was consecrated in 1034 and died on 18 or 19 September 1049.

== Citations ==
Christian titles
Preceded by Eadhericus	Bishop of Dorchester; 1034–1049	Succeeded by Ulfus Normanus
