= Ramsey Abbey =

English Benedictine abbey, now ruins

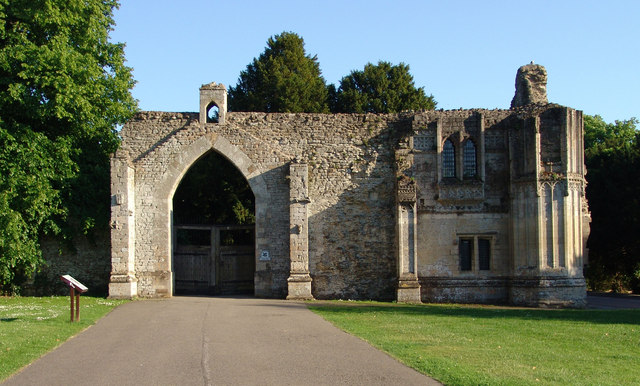
- Remains of Ramsey Abbey Gatehouse

- Location of Ramsey Abbey in Cambridgeshire
- 52°26′54″N 0°06′03″W
- Location: Ramsey, Cambridgeshire, England

History
- Founded: 969
- Built: 10th–16th centuries
- Demolished: 1537

Site notes
- Area: Huntingdonshire

Scheduled monument
- Official name: Ramsey Abbey (remains of)
- Reference no.: 1006838

Ramsey Abbey was a Benedictine abbey in Ramsey, Huntingdonshire (now part of Cambridgeshire), England. It was founded about AD 969 and dissolved in 1539.

The site of the abbey in Ramsey is now a scheduled monument. Most of the abbey's buildings were demolished after the dissolution but surviving structures are Grade I and Grade II* listed buildings. Ramsey Abbey Gatehouse is in the care of the National Trust and the Church of St Thomas à Becket, Ramsey was one of the buildings of the abbey.

== The Abbey ==
Ramsey Abbey was founded in 969 by Oswald, Bishop of Worcester, on land donated by Æthelwine, Ealdorman of East Anglia (Earl Ailwyn), where he had already built a wooden chapel for three monks. The foundation was part of the mid-10th-century English Benedictine reform, in which Ely and Peterborough were also refounded. Æthelwine gave the new foundation properties including an estate at nearby Bodsey and Houghton Mill.

The Frankish scholar Abbo of Fleury came to Ramsey at Oswald's invitation during the period 985–7, when his fortunes at Fleury Abbey were at a low ebb. He wrote two surviving works for his students while he was there; the Passio S. Eadmundi and the questiones grammaticales.

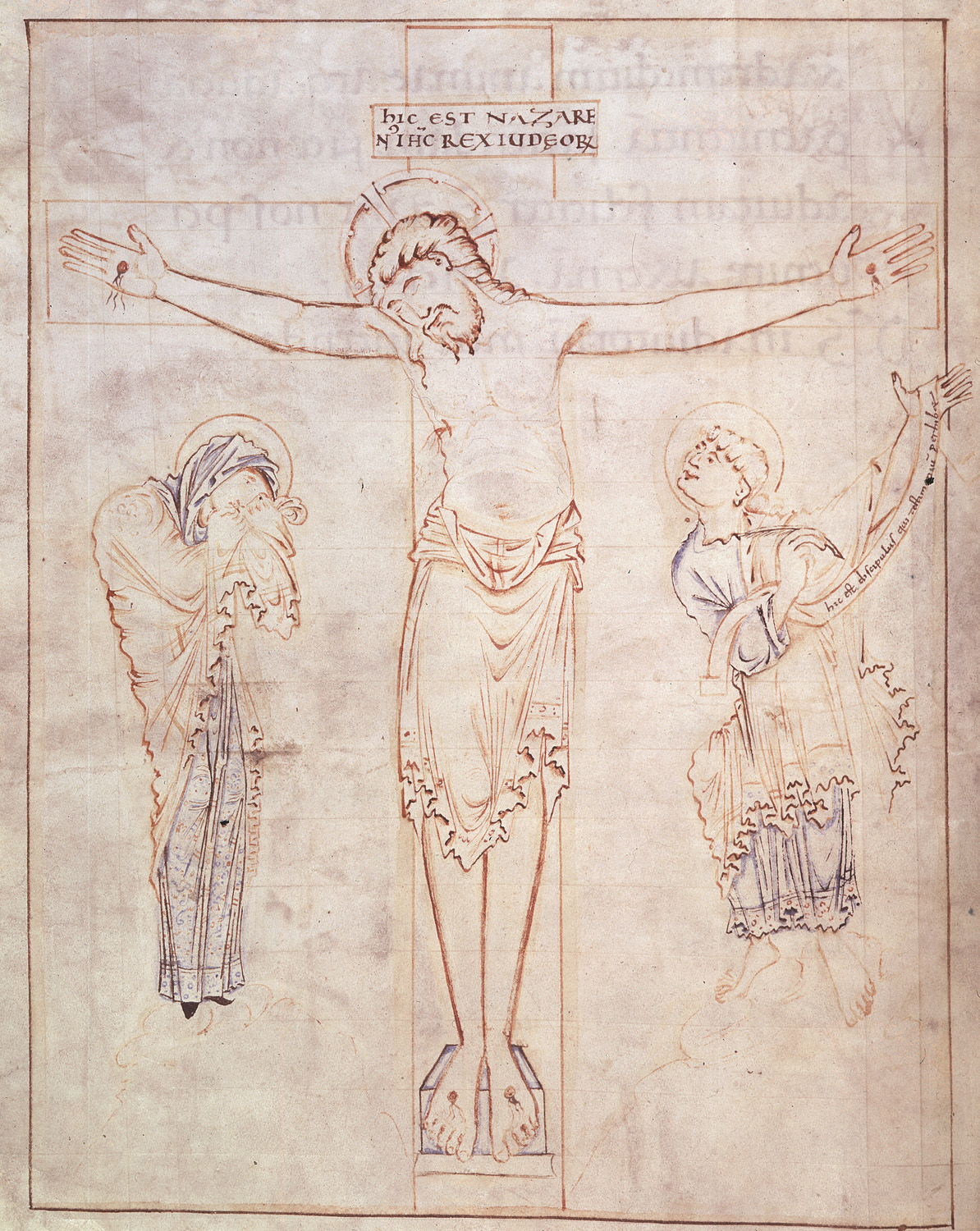
Tinted drawing of the Crucifixion from the Ramsey Psalter

The important Ramsey Psalter or Psalter of Oswald (British Library, Harley MS 2904) is an Anglo-Saxon illuminated psalter of the last quarter of the 10th century. Certain liturgical features have suggested that it was intended for use at Ramsey Abbey, or for the personal use of Ramsey's founder Oswald of Worcester. This is not to be confused with another Ramsey Psalter in the Pierpont Morgan Library, New York (MS M. 302), made between 1286 and 1316.

Æthelwine at the suggestion of Oswald of Worcester founded a small hermitage for three hermits with a wooden chapel at a location indicated by the actions of a bull, on the island of Ramsey with impassible fen on three sides. Impressed by the story Oswald sent a prior, Germanus and twelve monks from Westbury-on-Trym to form the Abbey. Starting in 969, a large stone-built church was built over the next five years. Two towers stood up at the topmost points of the roofs, the smaller one at the front of the church towards the west, 'offered a beautiful sight from afar' to people coming to the island. The larger one, in the middle of a four-armed structure rested on four columns stabilised by connecting arches. This abbey building remained until a Norman abbot had a grander church built in the 12th century.

In 1143 Geoffrey de Mandeville expelled the monks, used the abbey as a fortress and considerably damaged the buildings. The abbey suffered for three centuries from disputes with the bishops of Ely over the manors of Chatteris and Somersham. It paid 4,000 eels yearly to Peterborough Abbey for access to its quarries of limestone at Barnack.

In the order of precedence for abbots in Parliament, Ramsey was third after Glastonbury and St Alban's.

The abbey was an international centre of Hebrew scholarship in the late Middle Ages. It prospered until the Dissolution of the Monasteries in 1537. At the time of the Dissolution there were 34 monks.

In 1787 Mark Noble noted:

The abbey of Ramsey, i.e. the Ram's isle, was one of the richest foundations in the kingdom: the abbot was mitred, and sat in the house of lords as baron of Broughton; the abbey had 387 hides of land, 200 of which were in Huntingdonshire: the monks were not famed for their liberality, if we believe the following ancient lines:

Crowland as courteous, as courteous as may bee,
Thorney the bane of many a good Tree,
Ramsey the rich, and Peterborough the proud,
Sawtry by the way that poor abbay,
Gave more almes than all they.

== After the Dissolution ==
In 1540 the Crown sold the abbey lands to Sir Richard Williams (alias Cromwell). He used most of the abbey buildings as a source of stone for walls and cottages at hand, and to provide good Barnack stone for new buildings. He had part of the abbey gatehouse dismantled and re-erected at Hinchingbrooke House. Much stone was taken to Cambridge to build Gonville and Caius, King's and Trinity colleges. Stone was taken for the tower for the parish church of St Mary the Virgin in Godmanchester. This included a doorway from the abbey that was dismantled and re-erected as the west doorway of St Mary's. As late as 1672 stone for a new tower for Ramsey's own parish church of St Thomas à Becket was also taken from the Abbey.

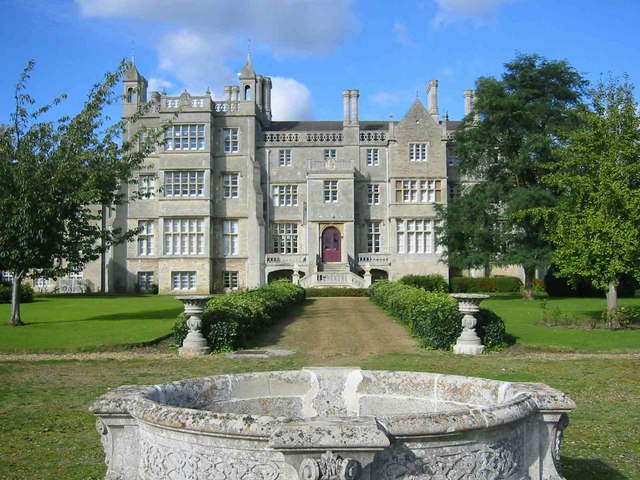
Ramsey Abbey House, remodelled in 1804–06 by Sir John Soane

Around 1600 Sir Henry Williams (alias Cromwell) had a house built on the site of the abbey church. Six bays of the 13th-century Lady Chapel survive as the basement of the house.

In 1737 Coulson Fellowes, later MP for Huntingdonshire, bought the house. It passed down through several generations of the family. In 1804–06 William Henry Fellowes had the abbey house enlarged to designs by Sir John Soane. In 1889 his son Edward Fellowes was created 1st Baron de Ramsey. In 1931 at the coming of age of John Ailwyn Fellowes, 4th Baron de Ramsey, the family moved its seat to Abbots Ripton Hall. In 1937 the Fellowes leased the building for 99 years to Ramsey Abbey School. In 1952 Major The Hon. Henry Rogers Broughton gave the gatehouse to the National Trust in memory of his late wife The Hon. Diana Broughton (née Fellowes).

== Surviving buildings and artefacts ==
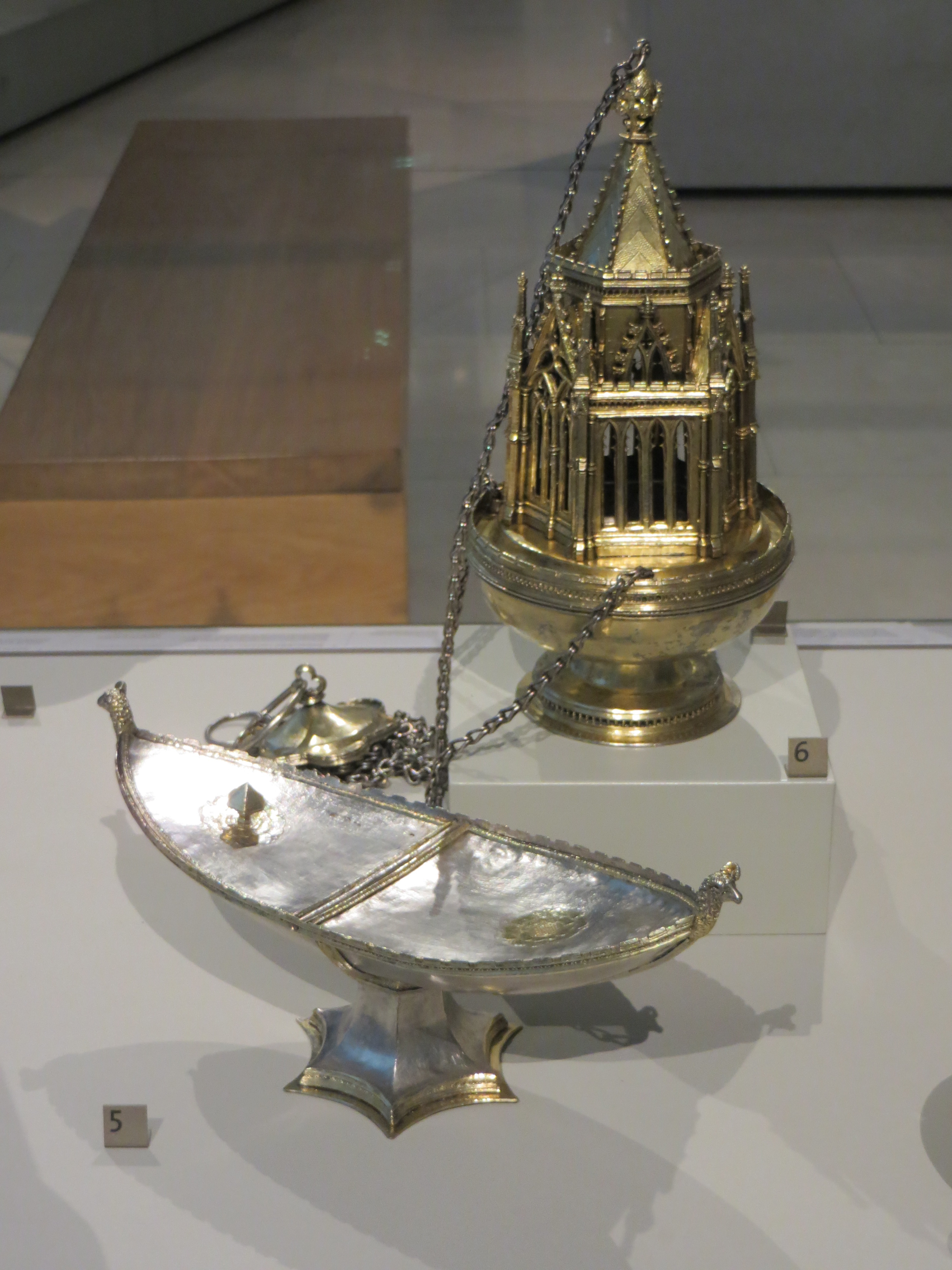
Ramsey Abbey Censer and Incense Boat, early to mid 14th-century, in the V&A Museum, London

Ramsey Abbey House, the Gatehouse, and the parish church of St Thomas à Becket all survive, along with part of the abbey's medieval precinct wall.

Ramsey Abbey House, the former 17th-century home of Sir Henry Cromwell and latterly the seat of the Fellowes family, is currently part of Abbey College, Ramsey. The Bodsey monastic grange survives as the Grade-I listed Bodsey House.

The Abbey Gatehouse is a National Trust property. This is believed to be an inner gatehouse, the main outer gatehouse was removed by Sir Henry Williams (alias Cromwell), the son and heir of Sir Richard, to form the main gateway to Hinchingbrooke House in Huntingdon, his newly built winter residence. Today what remains of the gatehouse also forms a part of the Abbey College. (Note: The new establishment Abbey College, Ramsey was formed from the amalgamation of Ramsey Abbey School with the adjacent Ailwyn School and has been operational from September 2006, leaving the previous two names defunct.)

The Church of St Thomas à Becket, Ramsey was built in about 1180 or 1190 as either the hospitium or the infirmary of the abbey. It was originally an aisled hall with a chapel at the east end with a vestry on the north side and the warden's lodgings on the south, but both these have been demolished. The building was converted into a parish church in about 1222.

When Whittlesey Mere was drained, a thurible and other silver items were found in the bed of the mere and, from the ram's head on one of these pieces, were believed to have come from the Abbey. The thurible (or censer), and an incense boat are now in the Victoria and Albert Museum. Also found in the bed were blocks of quarried stone, that are conjectured to have fallen from a barge on the way to the Abbey.

== Burials ==
- St Felix of Burgundy, whose remains were publicly displayed as relics
- Ivo of Ramsey, who gave his name to St Ives, Huntingdonshire

== Abbots ==
The names of abbots from AD 993 onwards are known. Notable among them are:

- Eadnoth the Younger, who was also Bishop of Dorchester, and was killed at the Battle of Assandun in 1016
- Aelfwine, abbot of Ramsey Abbey who witnessed the Accord of Winchester in 1072
- Herbert de Losinga, the first Bishop of Norwich, who died in 1119
- Reginald, commenced rebuilding of abbey in 1116
- Walter, abbot from 1133 to 1161, during the reign of Stephen and the invasion of Ramsey by Geoffrey de Mandeville, first Earl of Essex
- Hugh de Sulgrave, 1254-67
- William de Godmanchester, 1276
- Simon de Eye, 1330
