= Thomas Wouldham =

Bishop of Rochester (died 1317)

- Bishop of Rochester
- Elected: 6 June 1291
- Term ended: 28 February 1317
- Predecessor: Thomas Ingoldsthorpe
- Successor: Hamo Hethe
- Other post: Prior of Rochester

Orders
- Consecration: 6 January 1292

Personal details
- Died: 28 February 1317
- Denomination: Catholic

Thomas Wouldham (or Thomas de Wouldham or Thomas de Southflete) was a medieval Bishop of Rochester.

Wouldham was elected as prior of Rochester Cathedral on 24 December 1283. He was elected bishop by the chapter but renounced the election. He was again elected bishop on 6 June 1291 and consecrated on 6 January 1292. He died on 28 February 1317.

== Citations ==
Catholic Church titles
Preceded by Thomas Ingoldsthorpe	Bishop of Rochester; 1291–1317	Succeeded by Hamo Hethe
