= Prior of Rochester =

The Prior of Rochester was the head of the Benedictine Priory of St. Andrew established at Rochester Cathedral in 1083. The priory was dissolved in 1540 and the last prior, Walter Phillips (or Phylypp) became the first Dean of the Cathedral Church of Christ and the Blessed Virgin Mary.

| Years | Name | Alternative spellings | Notes | References |
|---|---|---|---|---|
| 1083–1089–96 | Ordouvin | Ordowinus | Wharton records Orduvin as mentioned in the Textus Roffensis and as having signed Gundulf's charter creating the priory on 20 September 1089. | Hastead (1798), Wharton (1691) |
| ? – 1096 | Ernulph | Arnulf | Wharton records a charter (in the Canterbury archives) as being signed by "Arnulfi Prioris Roffensis". Later Prior of Canterbury, Abbot of Peterborough then Bishop of Rochester. | Hastead (1798), Wharton (1691) disputed by Greenway (1971) |
| 1096–1107 | Ralph | Radulfus | Later Abbot of Battle | Hastead (1798), Wharton (1691), Greenway (1971) |
| 1107–1115? | Ordouvin (again) | | | Hastead (1798), Wharton (1691), Greenway (1971) |
| | Letard | | | Hastead (1798), Wharton (1691) |
| 1145?– 1146 | Brian | Brien | | Hastead (1798), Wharton (1691), Greenway (1971) |
| 1146?– 1154 | Reginald | | Obtained a confirmation of the privileges of Rochester from Pope Adrian IV in 1154 | Hastead (1798), Wharton (1691), Greenway (1971) |
| | Ernulf II | | | Hastead (1798), Wharton (1691) |
| | William [de] Borstalle | | | Hastead (1798), Wharton (1691), Greenway (1971) |
| fl. 1177 | Silvester | | Confirmed by Pope Alexandro in 1178. Following a fire he rebuilt the refecorty, dormitory and three windows in the chapter house. | Hastead (1798), Wharton (1691), Greenway (1971) |
| – 1182 | Richard | | Went to be Prior of Burton, Staffs | Hastead (1798), Wharton (1691), Greenway (1971) |
| 1182–1186 | Alfred | | Became Prior of Abingdon in May 1186 | Hastead (1798), Wharton (1691), Greenway (1971) |
| 1186 – | Osbern de Scapeya | Scapella | Author | Hastead (1798), Wharton (1691), Greenway (1971) |
| 1193?– 1208? | Ralph de Ros | | Expanded the priory, leaded the church roof. | Hastead (1798), Wharton (1691), Greenway (1971) |
| 1214?–1215 | Elias | Helias | Completed Ralph's work and further expansion | Hastead (1798), Wharton (1691), Greenway (1971) |
| 8 March 1215 | unnamed | | Appears in a legal case | Greenway (1971) |
| fl. 1222 | William | | | Hastead (1798), Wharton (1691), Greenway (1971) |
| 1225–1239 | Richard de Derente | | | Hastead (1798), Wharton (1691), Greenway (1971) |
| 1239–1241 | William de Hoo | | | Hastead (1798), Wharton (1691), Greenway (1971) |
| 1241–1252 | Alexander de Glanville | | | Hastead (1798), Wharton (1691), Greenway (1971) |
| – 1262 | Simon de Clyve | | Hastead actually says 1622 | Hastead (1798), Wharton (1691), Greenway (1971) |
| – 1283 | John de Renham | Rensham | | Hastead (1798), Wharton (1691), Greenway (1971) |
| – 1291 | Thomas de Wouldham | Suthflete | | Hastead (1798), Wharton (1691), Greenway (1971) |
| 1292–1294 | John de Renham | Rensham | (again) | Hastead (1798), Wharton (1691), Greenway (1971) |
| 1294–1301 | Thomas de Shelford | Shuldeford | | Hastead (1798), Wharton (1691), Greenway (1971) |
| 1301–1314 | John de Greenstreet | | | Hastead (1798), Wharton (1691) |
| 1314–1320 | Hamo de Hethe | | | Hastead (1798), Wharton (1691) |
| 1320–1321 | John de Westerham | | | Hastead (1798), Wharton (1691) |
| 1321–1333 | John de Speldherst | | | Hastead (1798), Wharton (1691) |
| 1333–1352 | John de Scapeya | Shepey | | Hastead (1798), Wharton (1691) |
| 1352–1361 | Robert de Suthflete | | | Hastead (1798), Wharton (1691) |
| 1361–1380 | John de Hertlepe | Hertley | | Hastead (1798), Wharton (1691) |
| 1380–1419 | John de Sheppey | Scapeya | | Hastead (1798), Wharton (1691) |
| 1419–1447 | William Tunbrygg | | | Hastead (1798), Wharton (1691) |
| 1447–1448 | John Clyfe | | | Hastead (1798) |
| 1448 – | John Cardone | | | Hastead (1798) |
| | Richard Pekham | | | |
| | William Wod | Wode | | Hastead (1798), Wharton (1691) |
| fl. 1480 | Thomas Bourne | | | Hastead (1798) |
| fl. 1496 | William Bishop | | | Hastead (1798), Wharton (1691) |
| 1508 – | William Frysell | Fresell | | Hastead (1798), Wharton (1691) |
| fl. 1533–34 | Laurence Mereworth | | | Hastead (1798) |
| – 1150 | Walter Boxley | Philips | Monks adopted the name of their birthplace on entering the monastery to signify the break with their family. Boxley retook his family name of Philips after the dissolution. | Hastead (1798) |
