= Thomas Ingoldsthorpe =

Bishop of Rochester (died 1291)

- Bishop of Rochester
- Elected: c. 9 July 1283
- Term ended: 11 May 1291
- Predecessor: John Kirkby
- Successor: Thomas Wouldham
- Other post: Dean of St Paul's

Orders
- Consecration: 26 September 1283 or 3 October 1283

Personal details
- Died: 11 May 1291

Thomas Ingoldsthorpe (or Thomas of Ingoldisthorpe) was a medieval Bishop of Rochester.

Ingoldsthorpe was from Ingoldisthorpe in Norfolk. He held the offices of Archdeacon of Sudbury in the diocese of Norwich, then was Archdeacon of Middlesex in the diocese of London. He was named Dean of St Paul's on 9 March 1277.

Ingoldsthorpe was elected about 9 July 1283 and consecrated on 26 September 1283 or 3 October 1283. He died on 11 May 1291.

== Citations ==
Catholic Church titles
Preceded by John Kirkby	Bishop of Rochester; 1283–1291	Succeeded by Thomas Wouldham
