= Rochester Cathedral =

Coordinates: 51°23′20″N 0°30′12″E

- Cathedral Church of Christ and the Blessed Virgin Mary
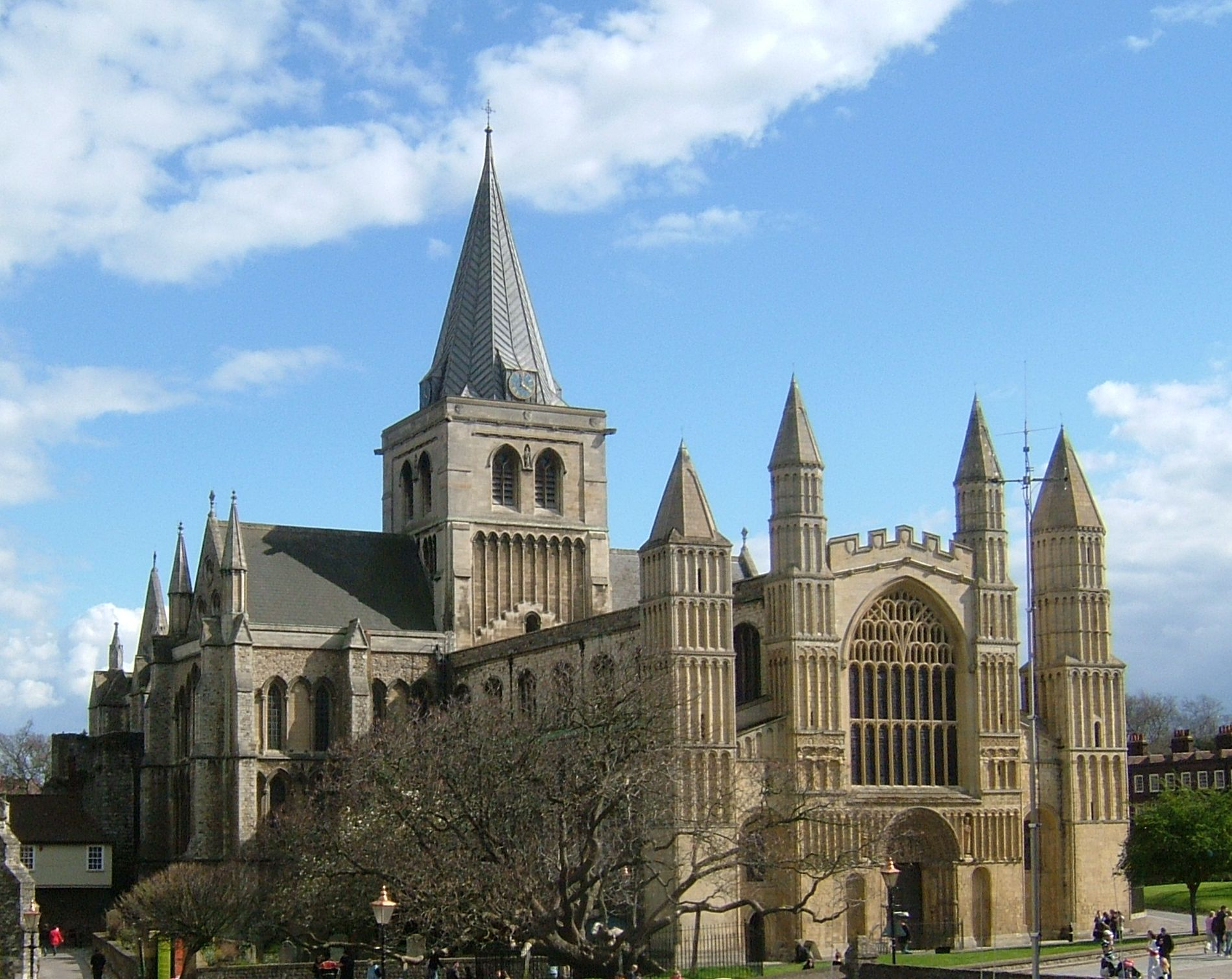
- Rochester Cathedral

- Shown within Kent
- OS grid reference: TQ 74273 68521
- Location: Rochester, Medway, Kent
- Country: England
- Denomination: Church of England
- Previous denomination: Roman Catholic
- Website: rochestercathedral.org

History
- Former name(s): Priory of St Andrew (604–1542)
- Status: Cathedral
- Founded: 604
- Founder: St Justus
- Consecrated: 604

Architecture
- Functional status: Active
- Heritage designation: Grade I
- Designated: 24 October 1950
- Architect: Gundulf of Rochester
- Style: Norman, Gothic
- Years built: 1079–1238

Administration
- Province: Canterbury
- Diocese: Rochester

Clergy
- Archbishop: Sarah Mullally
- Bishop: Jonathan Gibbs
- Dean: Philip Hesketh

Rochester Cathedral, formally the Cathedral Church of Christ and the Blessed Virgin Mary, is in Rochester, Kent, England. The cathedral is the mother church of the Church of England Diocese of Rochester and seat (cathedra) of the Bishop of Rochester, the second oldest bishopric in England after that of the Archbishop of Canterbury. The present cathedral, rebuilt on the site of its predecessor in the Norman style, is a Grade I listed building.

== History ==
=== Anglo-Saxon establishment ===
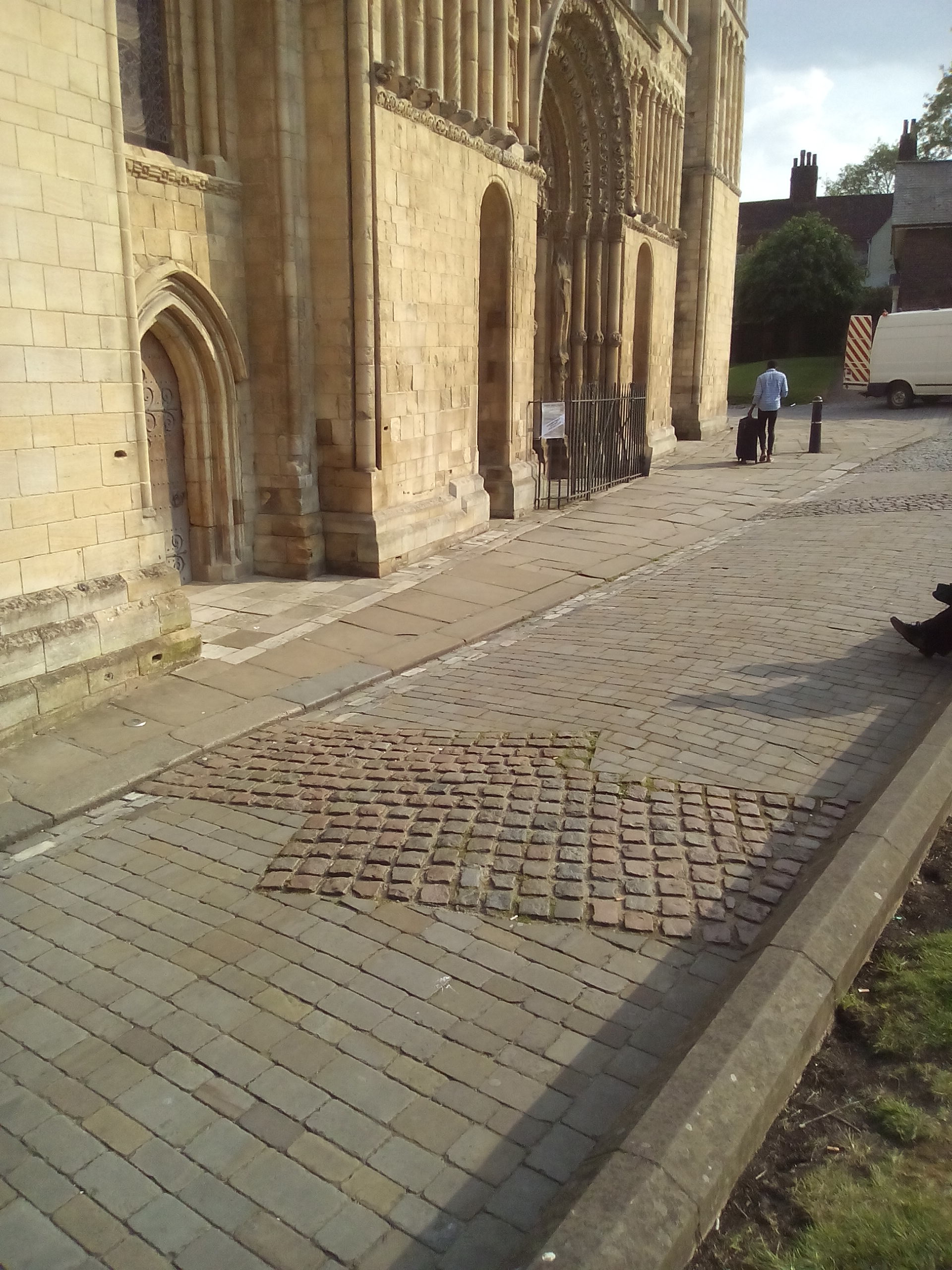
Setts showing the outline of the first building.

The Diocese of Rochester was founded by Justus, one of the missionaries who accompanied Augustine of Canterbury to convert the pagan southern English to Christianity in the early 7th century. As the first Bishop of Rochester, Justus was given permission by King Æthelberht of Kent to establish a church dedicated to Andrew the Apostle (like the monastery at Rome where Augustine and Justus had set out for England) on the site of the present cathedral, which was made the seat of a bishopric. The cathedral was to be served by a college of secular priests and was endowed with land near the city called Priestfields. (Note: Hasted spells this Prestefelde) (Note: The area is Priestfields, Priestfield is a road and football stadium some miles away.)

Under the Roman system, a bishop was required to establish a school for the training of priests. To provide the upper parts for music in the services a choir school was required. Together these formed the genesis of the cathedral school which today is represented by the King's School, Rochester. The quality of chorister training was praised by Bede.

The original cathedral was 42 feet (13 m) high and 28 feet (8.5 m) wide. The apse is marked in the current cathedral on the floor and the setts outside show the line of the walls. Credit for the construction of the building goes to King Æthelberht rather than St Justus. Bede describes St Paulinus' burial as "in the sanctuary of the Blessed Apostle Andrew which Æthelberht founded likewise he built the city of Rochester." (Note: in secretario beati apostoli Andreae quod rex Ediilbertus a fundamentis in eadem Rhofi civitate construxit.)

Æthelberht died in 617 and his successor, Eadbald of Kent, was not a Christian. Justus fled to Francia and remained there for a year before he was recalled by the king.

In 644 Ithamar, the first English-born bishop, was consecrated at the cathedral. (Note: Note English, ie Anglo-Saxon. The Celtic church in the North of England was British.) Ithamar consecrated Deusdedit as the first Saxon Archbishop of Canterbury on 26 March 655.

The cathedral suffered much from the ravaging of Kent by King Æthelred of Mercia in 676. So great was the damage that Putta retired from the diocese and his appointed successor, Cwichelm, gave up the see "because of its poverty".

In 762, the local overlord, Sigerd, granted land to the bishop, as did his successor Egbert. (Note: Sigered used the title rex dimidae partis provinciae Cantuariorum or "petty king of part of the province of Canterbury".) The charter is notable as it is confirmed by Offa of Mercia as overlord of the local kingdom.

Following the invasion of 1066, William the Conqueror granted the cathedral and its estates to his half-brother, Odo of Bayeux. Odo misappropriated the resources and reduced the cathedral to near-destitution. The building itself was ancient and decayed. During the episcopate of Siward (1058–1075) it was served by four or five canons "living in squalor and poverty". One of the canons became vicar of Chatham and raised sufficient money to make a gift to the cathedral for the soul and burial of his wife, Godgifu.

=== Medieval priory ===
==== Gundulf's church ====
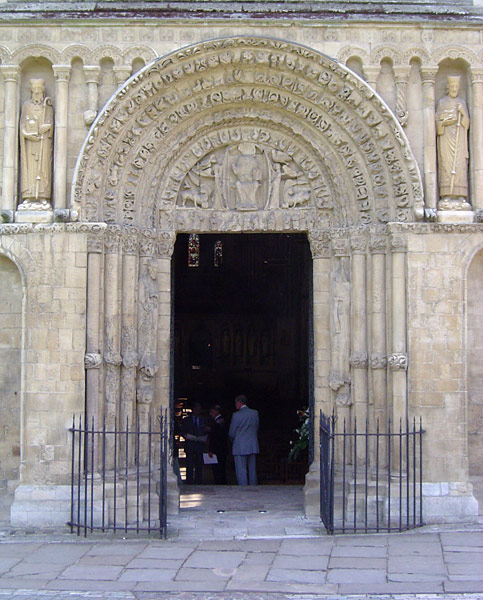
The Great West Door

Lanfranc, Archbishop of Canterbury, amongst others, brought Odo to account at the trial of Penenden Heath c. 1072. Following Odo's final fall, Gundulf was appointed as the first Norman bishop of Rochester in 1077. The cathedral and its lands were restored to the bishop. He was a talented architect who probably played a major part in the design or the works he commissioned. Gundulf's first undertaking in the construction of the new cathedral seems to have been the construction of the north-east tower which today bears his name. In about 1080 he began construction of a new cathedral to replace Justus' church, with financial support from Lanfranc.

The form of Gundulf's church has been the subject of much academic debate since the 19th century, especially regarding his east end. This was ultimately settled by archaeological excavation of the crypt in 2014, which found that the Norman cathedral had a square east end, from which projected a small structure containing a burial, interpreted as a shrine chapel, potentially that of Paulinus. The lack of an apse was very unusual in Norman architecture, but would later be de rigueur in English Gothic architecture. The long aisled presbytery had six bays, of which four stood upon the crypt. It was previously thought that Gundulf's Tower had a pair to the south, to form transeptal towers similar to Exeter Cathedral, but this is now considered unlikely. The transepts were 120 feet long, but only 14 feet wide. With such narrow transepts it is thought that there was not a full crossing. It is unclear whether a crossing tower was part of Gundulf's original scheme, or was added in the 12th century rebuildings. The nave was not completed at first. Apparently designed to be nine bays long, most of the south side but only five bays to the north were completed by Gundulf. The quire was required by the priory and the south wall formed part of its cloister. It has been speculated that Gundulf simply left the citizens to complete the parochial nave of the building.

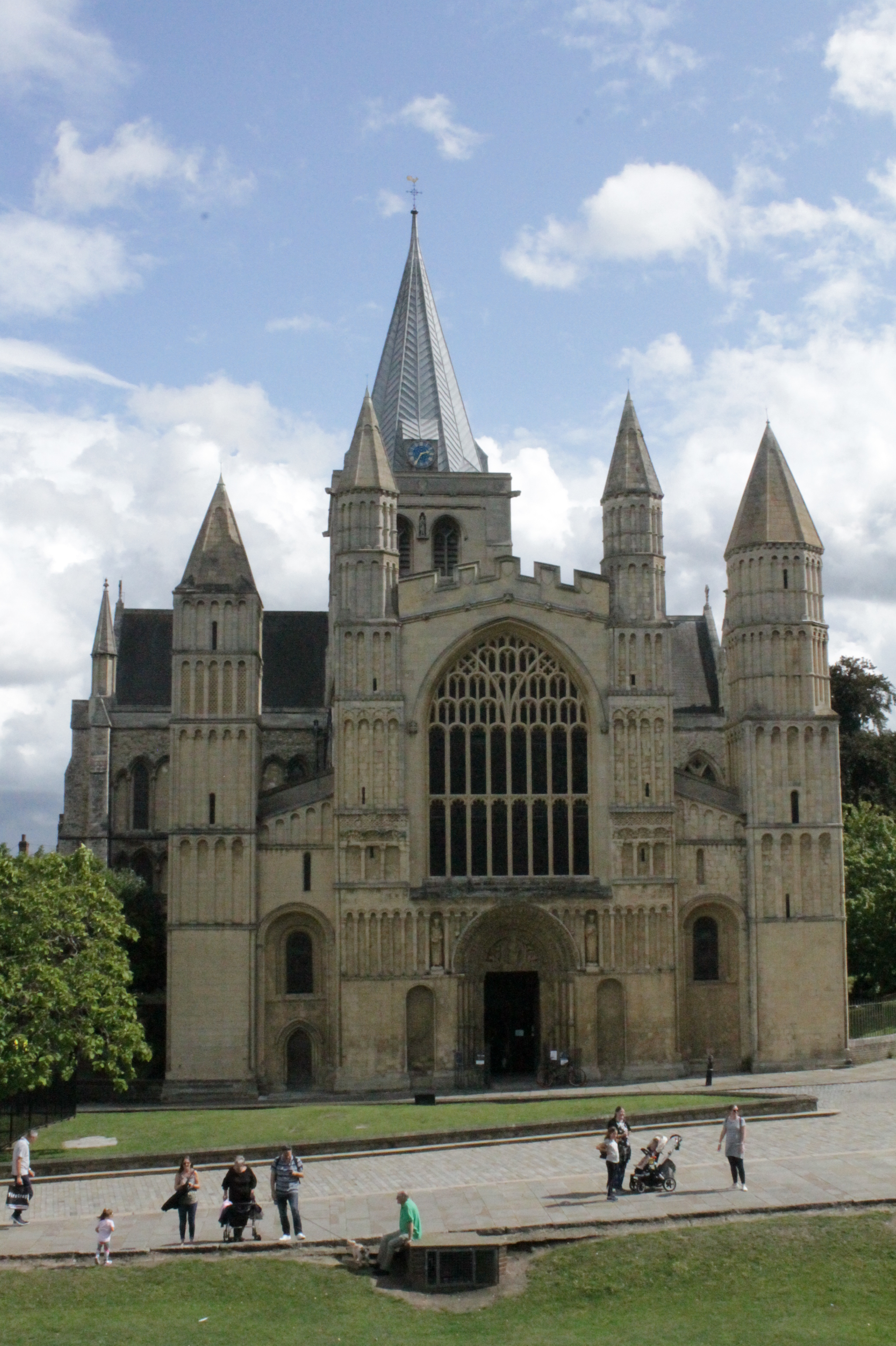
The west front

Gundulf did not stop with the fabric, he also replaced the secular chaplains with Benedictine monks, obtained several royal grants of land and proved a great benefactor to his cathedral city. In 1078 Gudulf founded St Bartholomew's Hospital just outside the city of Rochester. The Priory of St Andrew contributed daily and weekly provisions to the hospital which also received the offerings from the two altars of St James and of St Giles.

During the episcopates of Ernulf (1115–1124) and John (I) (1125–1137) the cathedral was completed. The quire was rearranged, the nave partly rebuilt, Gundulf's nave piers were cased and the west end built. Ernulf is also credited with building the refectory, dormitory and chapter house, only portions of which remain. Finally John translated the body of Ithamar from the old Saxon cathedral to the new Norman one, the whole being dedicated in 1130 (or possibly 1133) by the Archbishop of Canterbury, assisted by 13 bishops in the presence of Henry I, but the occasion was marred by a great fire which nearly destroyed the whole city and damaged the new cathedral. It was badly damaged by fires again in 1137 and 1179. One or other of these fires was sufficiently severe to badly damage or destroy the eastern arm and the transepts. Ernulf's monastic buildings were also damaged.

==== Medieval remodelling ====
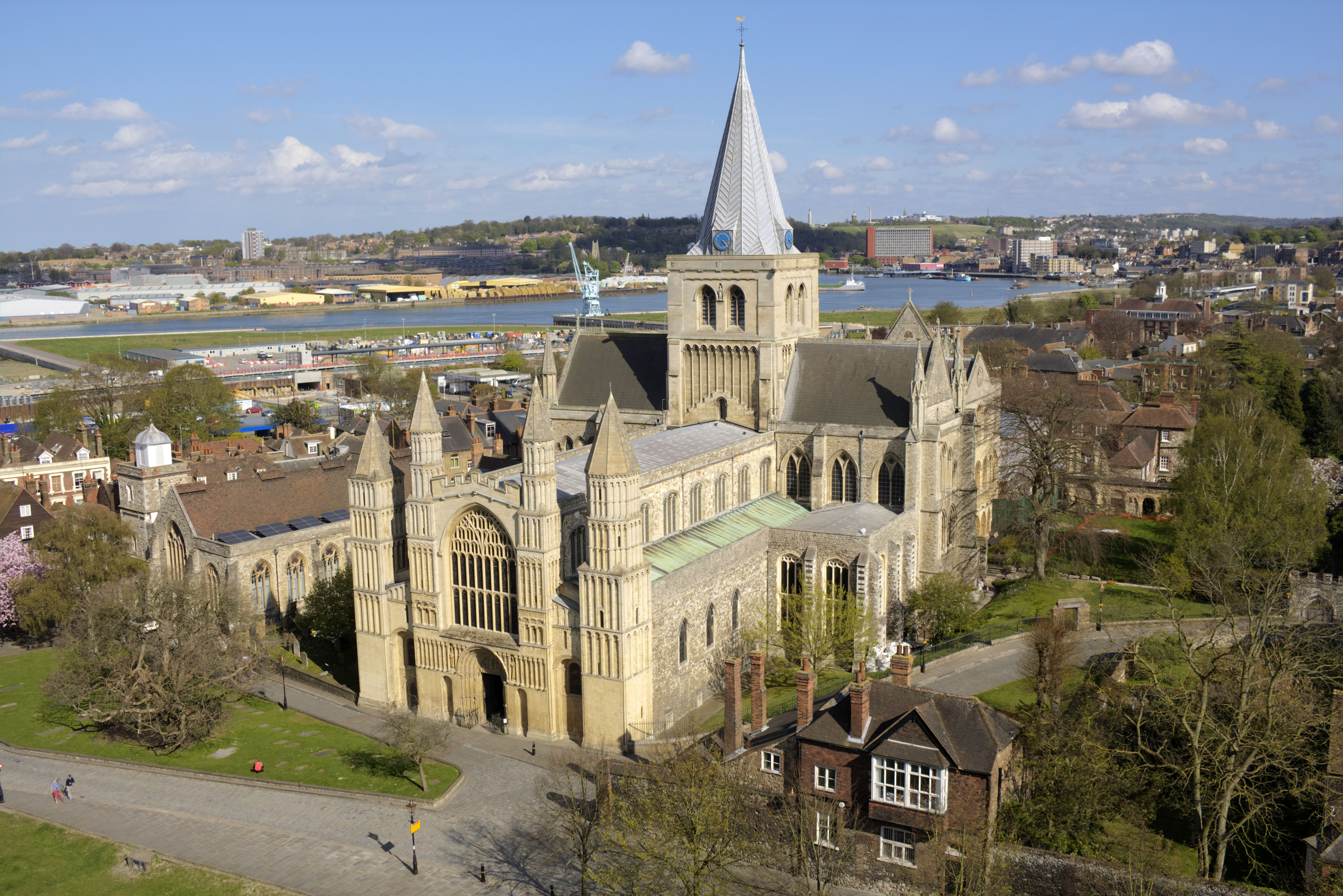
View over Rochester Cathedral from Rochester Castle

Probably from about 1190, Gilbert de Glanville (bishop 1185–1214) commenced the rebuilding of the east end and the replacement on the monastic buildings. The north quire transept may have been sufficiently advanced to allow the burial of St William of Perth in 1201, alternatively the coffin may have lain in the north quire aisle until the transept was ready. It was then looted in 1215 by the forces of King John during the siege of Rochester Castle. Edmund de Hadenham recounts that there was not a pyx left "in which the body of the Lord might rest upon the altar". However, by 1227, the quire was again in use when the monks made their solemn entry into it. The cathedral was rededicated in 1240 by Richard Wendene (also known as Richard de Wendover) who had been translated from Bangor.

The shrines of Ss Paulinus and William of Perth, along with the relics of St Ithamar, drew pilgrims to the cathedral. Their offerings were so great that both the work mentioned above and the ensuing work could be funded.

Unlike the abbeys of the period (which were led by an abbot) the monastic cathedrals were priories ruled over by a prior with further support from the bishop. Rochester and Carlisle (the other impoverished see) were unusual in securing the promotion of a number of monks to be bishop. Seven bishops of Rochester were originally regular monks between 1215 and the Dissolution. A consequence of the monastic attachment was a lack of patronage at the bishop's disposal. By the early 16th century only 4% of the bishop's patronage came from non-parochial sources. The bishop was therefore chronically limited in funds to spend on the non-monastic part of the cathedral.

The next phase of the development was begun by Richard de Eastgate, the sacrist. The two eastern bays of the nave were cleared and the four large piers to support the tower were built. The north nave transept was then constructed. The work was nearly completed by Thomas de Mepeham who became sacrist in 1255. Not long after the south transept was completed and the two bays of the nave nearest the crossing rebuilt to their current form. The intention seems to have been to rebuild the whole nave, but probably lack of funds saved the late Norman work.

The cathedral was desecrated in 1264 by the troops of Simon de Montfort, during sieges of the city and castle. It is recorded that armed knights rode into the church and dragged away some refugees. Gold and silver were stolen and documents destroyed. Some of the monastic buildings were turned into stables. Just over a year later De Montfort fell at the Battle of Evesham to the forces of Edward I. Later, in 1300, Edward passed through Rochester on his way to Canterbury and is recorded as having given seven shillings (35p) at the shrine of St William, and the same again the following day. During his return he again visited the cathedral and gave a further seven shillings at each of the shrines of Ss Paulinus and Ithamar.

The new century saw the completion of the new Decorated work with the original Norman architecture, the rebuilding of the nave being finally abandoned. Around 1320 the south transept was altered to accommodate the altar of the Virgin Mary.

There appears to have been a rood screen thrown between the two western piers of the crossing. A rood loft may have surmounted it. Against this screen was placed the altar of St Nicholas, the parochial altar of the city. The citizens demanded the right of entrance by day or night to what was after all their altar. There were also crowds of strangers passing through the city. The friction broke out as a riot in 1327 after which the strong stone screens and doors which wall off the eastern end of the church from the nave were built. The priory itself was walled off from the town at this period. An oratory was established in angulo navis ("in the corner of the nave") for the reserved sacrament; it is not clear which corner was being referred to, but Dr Palmer argues that the buttress against the north-west tower pier is the most likely setting. He notes the arch filled in with rubble on the aisle side; and on nave side there is a scar line with lower quality stonework below. The buttress is about 4 feet (1.2 m) thick, enough for an oratory. Palmer notes that provision for reservation of consecrated hosts was often made to the north of the altar which would be the case here.

The central tower was at last raised by Hamo de Hythe in 1343, thus essentially completing the cathedral. Bells were placed in the central tower (see Bells section below). The chapter room doorway was constructed at around this time. The Black Death struck England in 1347–49. From then on there were probably considerably more than twenty monks in the priory.

==== Later medieval history ====
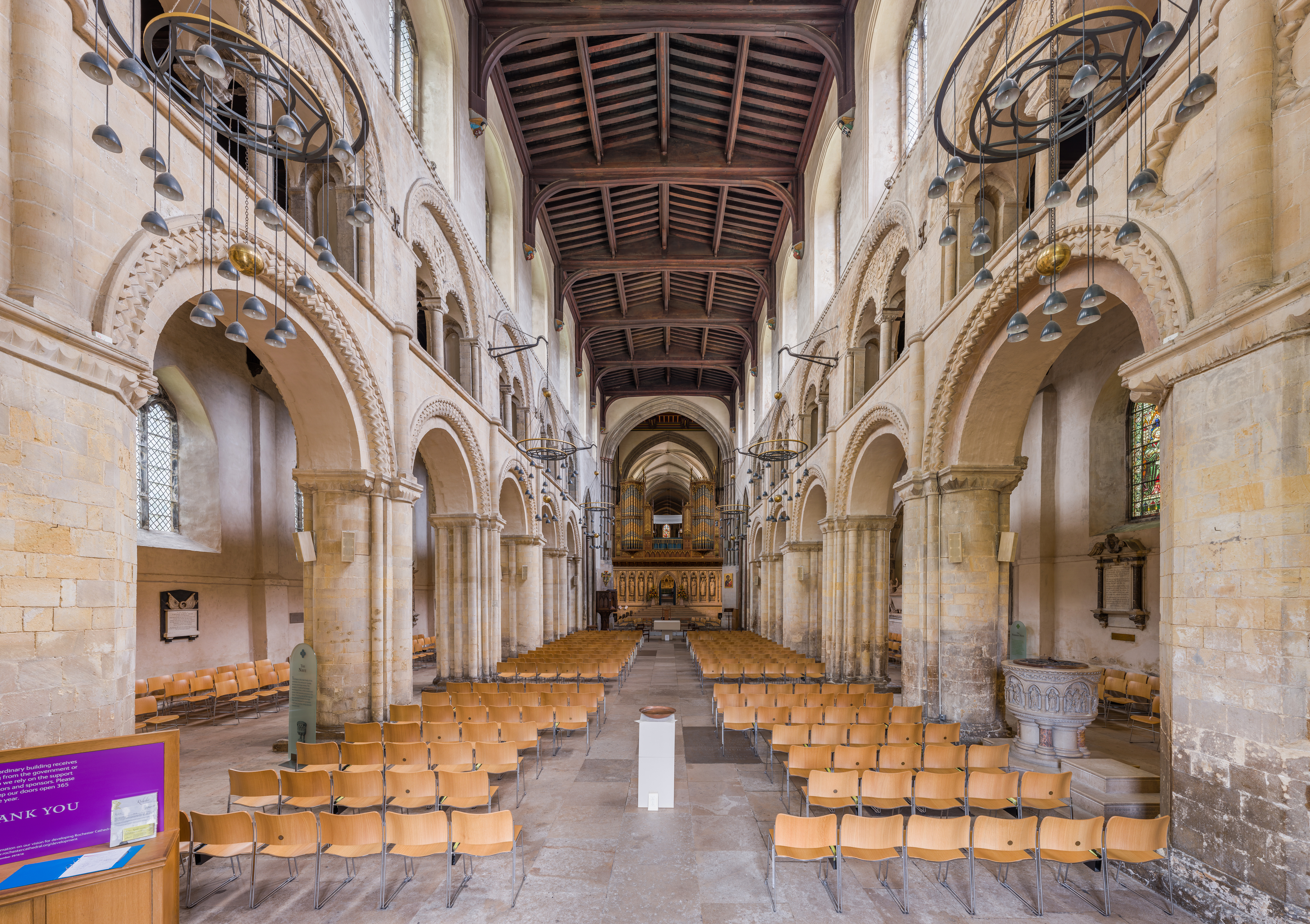
Nave looking east towards the altar

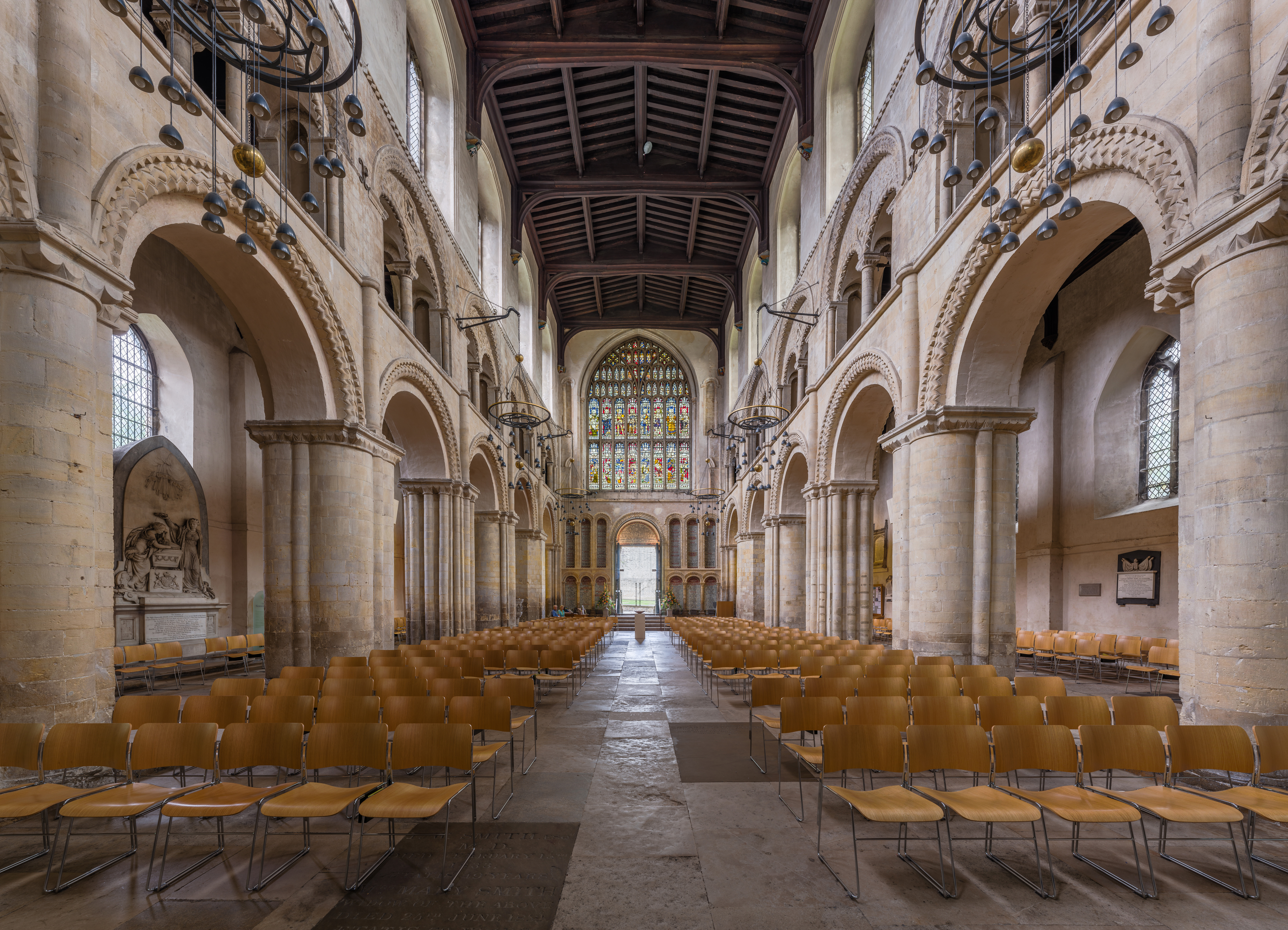
Nave looking west

The modern paintwork of the quire walls is modelled on artwork from the Middle Ages. Gilbert Scott found remains of painting behind the wooden stalls during his restoration work in the 1870s. The painting is therefore part original and part modern. The alternate lions and fleurs-de-lis reflect Edward III's victories, and assumed sovereignty over the French. In 1356 the Black Prince had defeated John II of France at Poitiers and taken him prisoner. On 2 July 1360 John passed through Rochester on his way home and made an offering of 60 crowns (£15) at the Church of St Andrew.

The Oratory provided for the Rochester citizens did not settle the differences between the monks and the city. The eventual solution was the construction of St Nicholas' Church by the north side of the cathedral. A doorway was knocked through the western end of the north aisle (since walled up) to allow processions to pass along the north aisle of the cathedral before leaving by the west door.

In the mid-15th century the clerestory and vaulting of the north quire aisle was completed and new Perpendicular Period windows inserted into the nave aisles. Possible preparatory work for this is indicated in 1410–11 by the Bridge Wardens of Rochester who recorded a gift of lead from the Lord Prior. The lead was sold on for 41 shillings. (Note: "Item Ressu do ploum do monsieur Priour do Rowchest xljs" Item of lead received from the Lord Prior of Rochester 41s) In 1470 the great west window at the cathedral was completed and finally, in around 1490, what is now the Lady Chapel was built. Rochester Cathedral, although one of England's smaller cathedrals, thus demonstrates all styles of Romanesque and Gothic architecture.

In 1504 John Fisher was appointed Bishop of Rochester. Although Rochester was by then an impoverished see, Fisher elected to remain as bishop for the remainder of his life. He had been tutor to the young Prince Henry and on the prince's accession as Henry VIII, Fisher remained his staunch supporter and mentor. He figured in the anti-Lutheran policies of Henry right up until the divorce issue and split from Rome in the early 1530s. Fisher remained true to Rome and for his defence of the Pope was elevated as a cardinal in May 1535. Henry was angered by these moves and, on 22 June 1535, Cardinal Fisher was beheaded on Tower Green in the Tower of London.

Henry VIII visited Rochester on 1 January 1540 when he met Anne of Cleves, who was to become his fourth wife, for the first time and was "greatly disappointed". The Priory of St Andrew was dissolved by royal command later in the year, one of the last monasteries to be dissolved.

=== Modern foundation ===
==== Henrician settlement ====
The post-Dissolution foundation was a dean, six prebendaries, six minor canons, a deacon, a sub-deacon, six lay clerks, a master of the choristers, eight choristers, an upper and an under master of the grammar school, twenty scholars, six poor men, a porter (who was also to be barber), a butler, chief cook and assistant. Four scholars (two each at Oxford and Cambridge universities) were supported. The deacon and sub-deacon disappeared during the English Reformation, the butler and cooks went when there was no longer a common board.

Nicholas Ridley was consecrated Bishop of Rochester in 1547 during the reign of Edward VI. During his time at Rochester he directed that the altars in the churches of his diocese should be removed and tables put in their place to celebrate the Lord's Supper. (Note: See Altar#Anglican churches for a discussion of the differences. At the time the distinction was a key differentiator between Catholic and Protestant.) In 1548 he helped Thomas Cranmer compile the Book of Common Prayer and in 1549 he was one of the commissioners who investigated bishops Stephen Gardiner and Edmund Bonner and agreed that they should be removed from office. In 1550 he was translated to the London; three years later Ridley was involved in the plot to place Lady Jane Grey on the throne in preference to the Roman Catholic Queen Mary. The plot failed and Ridley paid the price; he was burnt at the stake for treason on 16 October 1555.

The cathedral suffered a steep decline after the dissolution of the monasteries in the 16th century, during which time its estates were confiscated by the Crown, and it became dilapidated and fell into disrepute. Samuel Pepys, the diarist, would later dismiss it as a "shabby place". Rochester's location beside Watling Street did, however, mean that there continued to be a string of notable visitors. Most famously, Queen Elizabeth I stayed in Rochester for four days in 1573, attending divine service in the cathedral on 19 September. In 1606 James I & VI and his brother-in-law, Christian IV of Denmark, visited the city, accompanied by his family (Queen Anne and Prince Henry). James was accommodated at the bishop's palace and the whole party attended a Sunday service led by William Barlow.

William Laud, Archbishop of Canterbury, visited the cathedral in 1633 and complained about its general state, in particular that it "suffered much for want of glass in the windows". By the following year the defects had been mainly remedied (apart from some of the glass), the excuse being that the backlog had built up due to money (£1,000) being spent on "making of the organs". Laud accepted this and required completion, noting among other items that the bells and their frame needed to be put into good order (see below, in 1635 one bell was recast).

In 1635 the cathedral was described as: "small and plaine, yet it is very lightsome and pleasant: her [the cathedral's] quire is neatly adorn'd with many small pillars of marble; her organs though small yet are they rich and neat; her quiristers though but few, yet orderly and decent." The author then describes the various monuments "divers others also of antiquity, so dismembred, defac'd and abused". The reference to the monuments is particularly relevant, for this was six years before the despoliation of the cathedral by Parliamentarian soldiers in the wake of the English Civil War.

In 1641 John Evelyn paid his first visit to the cathedral as recorded in his diary: "The 19th we rod to Rochester, and having seene the Cathedrall."

==== Civil War ====
The official record runs: "On Wednesday, being Bartholomew Day, we marched forth, some of our souldiers ... went to the Cathedrall about 9 or 10 of the clock, in the midst of their superstitious worship, with their singing men and boyes; they ... went about the work they came for. First they removed the table to its place appointed, and then tooke the seat which it stood upon, ... and brake that all to pieces; ...they pluckt down the rails and left them for the poore to kindle their fires; and so left the organs to be pluckt down when we came back again, but it appeared before we came back they took them downe themselves." Post-Restoration, the relative lack of damage was noted, in particular the "monuments of the dead" were not defaced, although one John Wyld (a freeman and shoemaker of Rochester) was accused of taking down and selling iron and brass from some tombs. Thomas Fairfax's troops stabled their horses in the quire as in other cathedrals. Although no structural damage seems to have occurred, several saw pits were dug in the nave floor.

Shortly after the Restoration, Samuel Pepys visited Rochester Cathedral on his way between the London and Chatham Dockyard. The cathedral had fallen into disrepair during the Commonwealth and Pepys observed it was "now fitting for use, and the organ then a-tuning". By 1662 £8,000 had been spent and a further £5,000 for repairs were outstanding. The joint diocesan registrar to the bishops from 1629 until 1671 was Peter Stowell. Under the Commonwealth his loyalty had cost him both fines and his liberty. He spent his own money recovering various books and fittings as well as spending £100 on flooring the church from the west door to the pulpitum. The Dean of Rochester led prayers in memory of French Vice-Admiral Jean-Claude de La Robinière who was killed in enemy action by the Spanish-Dutch navy in 1667. In 1770 Archdeacon John Warner oversaw the removal of seats from the chancels with communion tables set up and railed "as formerly", a notably early readoption of the railed altar.

The cathedral fabric required continuous care: in 1664 the south aisle was recased and in 1670 40 feet of the north aisle had to be rebuilt. In 1679 the spire was in a dangerous state and an architect, Samuel Guy, reported on it. He reported that £1,000 of work was needed, however a few months later a Westminster carpenter, Henry Fry, opined that some lead work and the repair of one beam was sufficient. £160 was spent on the organ. In 1705 work started to relead the roof, completed by 1724. In 1730 the old ringers' loft above the quire steps was removed and the crossing vaulted. Between 1742 and 1743 major work was undertaken in the quire, sufficiently disruptive that the dean and chapter used nearby St Nicholas' Church. In 1749 the steeple had to be rebuilt and between 1765 and 1772 the west front towers were rebuilt.

The cathedral's south quire aisle and transept were giving cause for concern, so in 1751 they were buttressed, the roof lightened and supporting brickwork placed in the crypt. In 1798 Edward Hasted wrote a description of the cathedral and its environs, published as part of his The History and Topographical Survey of the County of Kent. He observed that "time has so far impaired the strength of the materials with which it is built, that in all likelihood the care and attention of the present chapter towards the support of it will not be sufficient to prevent the fall of a great part of it at no great distance of time". A new organ in 1791 completed the 18th-century works.

==== 19th century onwards ====
From 1825 to 1830 Lewis Nockalls Cottingham served as diocesan architect. The quire and its south transept were reroofed because of dry rot. The wall between the main transept and the south quire aisle was still leaning, and the previous century's work had actually worsened the situation. Cottingham built a new external face which effectively buttresses the original wall. The tower was demolished and rebuilt without a spire. The east end was remodelled by lowering the altar and removing the old altar screen. Various windows and arches were opened up and in one of them the tomb of John de Sheppey was discovered.

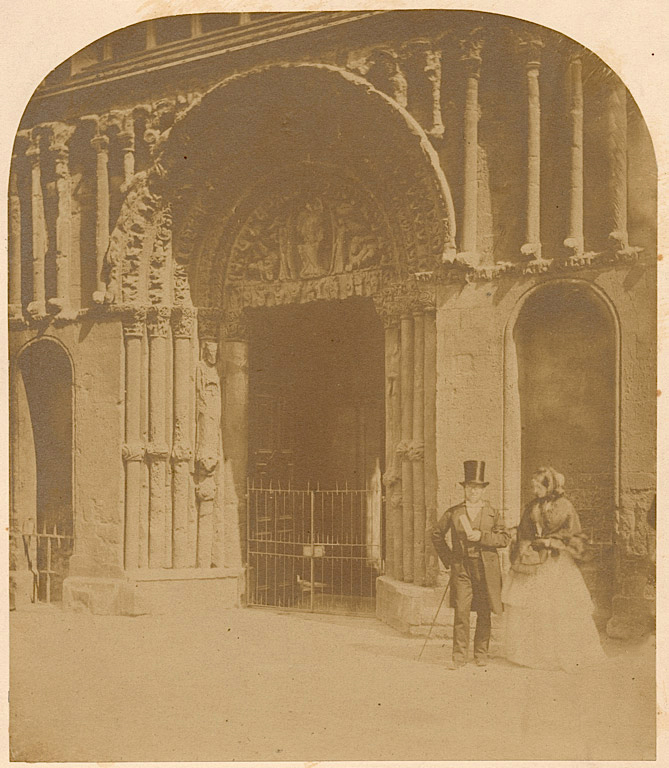
Frederick Scott Archer (1813–1856), Rochester Cathedral, England, early 1850s, albumen print from wet plate collodion negative, Department of Image Collections, National Gallery of Art Library, Washington, DC

Cottingham remained in charge for the next phase of restoration. From 1840 the pulpit and bishop's throne were rebuilt. The removal of the old pulpit revealed the medieval Wheel of Life painting to be seen at the eastern end of the choir stalls today. It is said to be the oldest such painting in England. A new ceiling of the crossing, new canopy for John de Sheppey, cleaning whitewash and the renovation of the crypt all occurred at this time.

From 1871 to 1877 the work was entrusted to George Gilbert Scott. The first phase of the work was to repair the clerestory of the nave, the nave could then be used for service whilst the quire and transepts were worked upon. The south transept was underpinned and the timber vaulting renovated. The north transept had new western windows and a new door. Both had the masonry renovated. The gables and roofs were restored to their old high pitch form based on prints. The organ screen was restored to its original plain form, perhaps a mistake since there was now no screen on the other side of the pulpitum as there had been in the days of St Nicholas' altar. The east end gables were raised, but due to lack of funds the roof has still not been raised to match. The east window ("ugly" according to Palmer) was replaced with the present lancets. The floor of the presbytery was lowered and the whole eastern part of the building refloored. The choir and prebends stalls were renovated, using original material where possible. The work uncovered the original lion and fleur-de-lis heraldic mural painting on which Scott based his decoration of the quire.

In memory of Robert Scott (sometime Dean) the quire screen was decorated with the current statues by John Loughborough Pearson. Pearson also superintended the 1888 restoration of the west front, parts of the facing of which were separating from the core. The flanking turrets were restored to their original height and form and the north gable turret rendered as a copy of its partner to the south. The great west door was also restored, with the north side of the label mould and of the outer order of voussoirs being replaced. During this work the ancient foundations of the original church were uncovered and marked out as noted above.

In 1904 the present spire was raised upon the Scott Tower, creating the skyline as it is today. During 1998 the precinct beyond the Great West Door was being repaved when further Saxon foundations were uncovered. The coloured setts define the outline.

For the 1400th anniversary of the cathedral, in 2004, a new fresco was painted by Russian icon-painter Sergei Fyodorov in the north transept.

In the summer of 2019, the Nave became host to a temporary nine-hole mini-golf course, with each hole including a model of a different type of bridge. A representative from Cathedral explained that "We hope that, while playing adventure golf, visitors will reflect on the bridges that need to be built in their own lives and in our world today."

== Architecture ==
=== Exterior ===
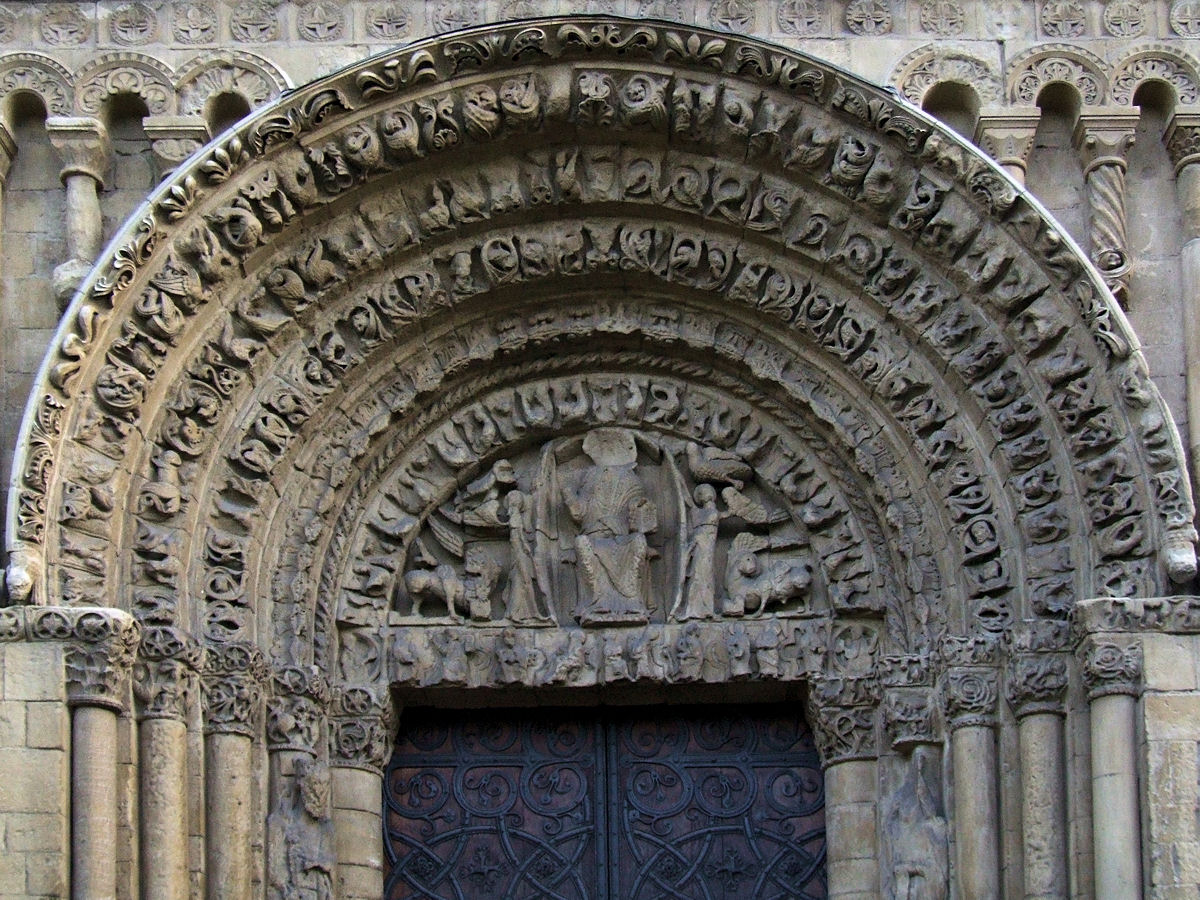
Tympanum above the west door

The west front is dominated by the central Perpendicular west window. Above the window the hood mould terminates in a small carved head at each side. The line of the nave roof is delineated by a string course above which rises the crenellated parapet. Below the window is a blind arcade interrupted by the top of the Great West Door. Some of the niches in the arcade are filled with statuary. Below the arcade the door is flanked with Norman recesses. The doorway itself Romanesque, with five orders of ornamented voussoirs, or archivolts. The semicircular tympanum depicts Christ sitting in glory in the centre, with Saints Justus and Ethelbert flanking him on either side of the doorway. Supporting the saints are angels and surrounding them are the symbols of the Four Evangelists: Matthew (a winged man), Mark (a lion), Luke (an ox) and John (an eagle). On the lintel below are the Twelve Apostles and on the shafts supporting it King Solomon and the Queen of Sheba. The construction and dating of the door have been a matter of scholarly debate. There are stylistic differences between the voussoirs and the jamb statues and tympanum, while the latter has been severely trimmed to fit under the archway. Ron Baxter dates the original doorway to the 1140s, and the modifications to the 1160s. The original work was similar in style to that of Aquitaine, while the inserted sculpture derived from Romano-Gothic developments in Burgundy and the Île de France, particularly the Royal Portal at Chartres and the south portal at Le Mans. Within the Great West Door there is a glass porch which allows the doors themselves to be kept open throughout the day.

On either side of the west front rises a thin tower or turret which forms the junction of the front and the nave walls. The towers are decorated with blind arcading and are carried up a further two stories above the roof and surmounted with pyramidal spires. The aisle ends are Norman. Each has a large round headed arch containing a window and in the northern recess is a small door. Above each arch is plain wall surmounted by a blind arcade, string course at the roof line and plain parapet. The flanking towers are Norman in the lower part with the style being maintained in the later work. Above the plain bases there are four stories of blind arcading topped with an octagonal spire.

The outside of the nave and its aisles is undistinguished, apart from the walled up north-west door which allowed access from the cathedral to the adjacent St Nicholas' Church. The north transept is reached from the High Street via Black Boy Alley, a medieval pilgrimage route. The decoration is Early English, but reworked by Gilbert Scott. Scott rebuilt the gable ends to the original high pitch from the lower one adopted at the start of the 19th century. The gable itself is set back from the main wall behind a parapet with walkway. He also restored the pilgrim entrance and opened up the blind arcade in the northern end of the west wall.

To the east of the north transept is the Sextry Gate. It dates from Edward III's reign and has wooden domestic premises above. The area beyond was originally enclosed, but is now open to the High Street through the memorial garden and gates. Beyond the Sextry Gate is the entrance to Gundulf's Tower, used as a private back door to the cathedral.

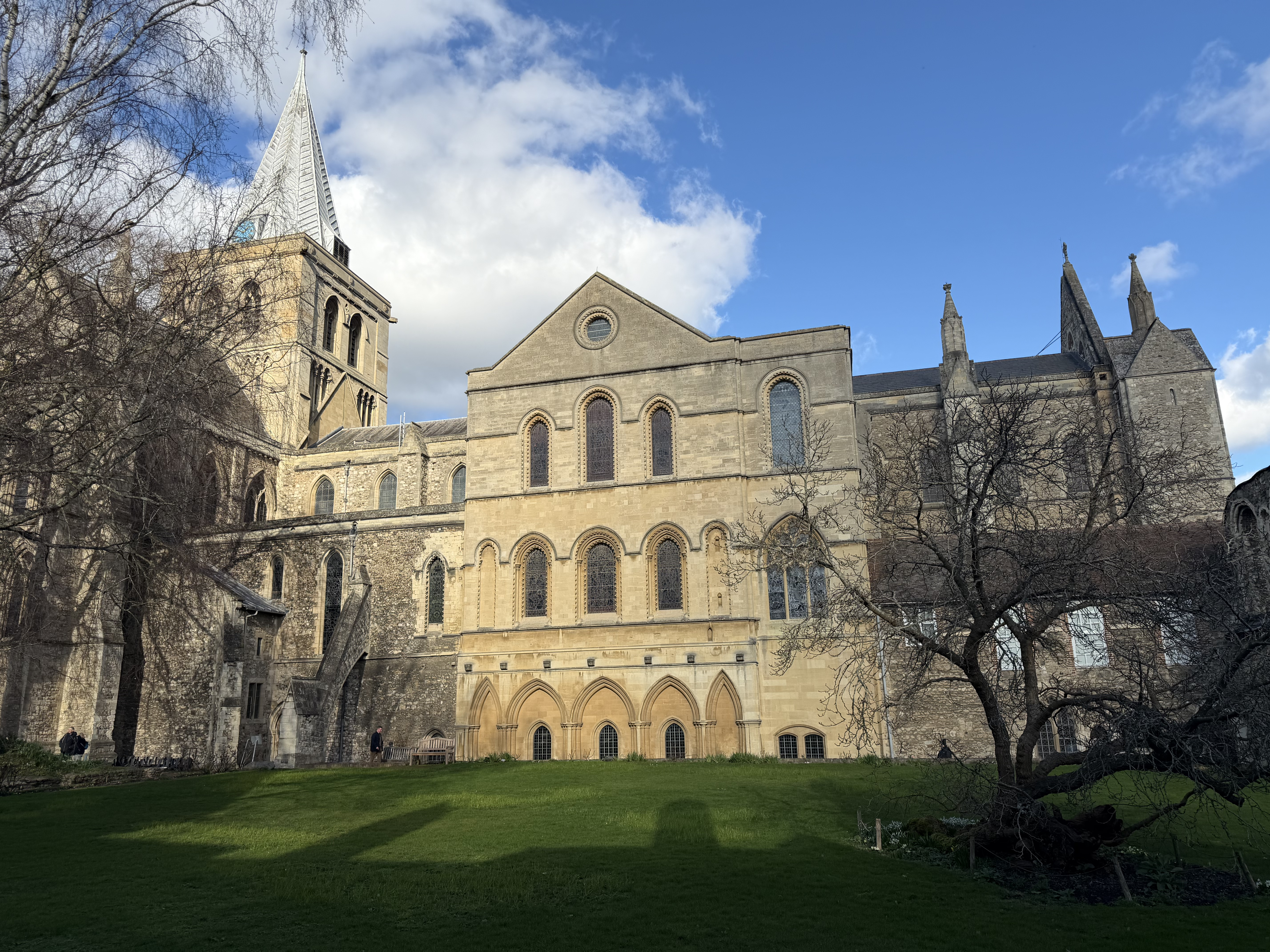
The south side and transept of Rochester Cathedral

The north quire transept and east end are all executed in Early English style, the lower windows light the crypt which is earlier. Adjoining the east end of the cathedral is the east end of the Chapter Room which is in the same style. The exact form of the east end is more modern than it appears, being largely due to the work of Scott in the 19th century. Scott raised the gable ends to the original high pitch, but for lack of funds the roofs have not been raised; writing in 1897 Palmer noted: "they still require roofs of corresponding pitch, a need both great and conspicuous".

On the south side of the cathedral the nave reaches the main transept and beyond a modern porch. The aisle between the transepts is itself a buttress to the older wall behind and supported by a flying buttress. The unusual position of this wall is best explained when considering the interior, below. The southern wall of the presbytery is hidden by the chapter room, an 18th-century structure.

=== Cloisters and ancillary buildings ===
The Norman Chapter House façade

The cloister was at the heart of the monastery and its outlines can be followed in the cloister garth. The eastern part was formed by Bishop Ernulf's Chapter House and dormitory of which now only the western wall survives. To the south of the cloister was the refectory, the work of Prior Helias (also known as Élie) in about 1215. The lower part of its north wall remains and is of massive construction, being a surviving section of the Roman city wall, made redundant by the growth of the city beyond it.

=== Gundulf Tower ===
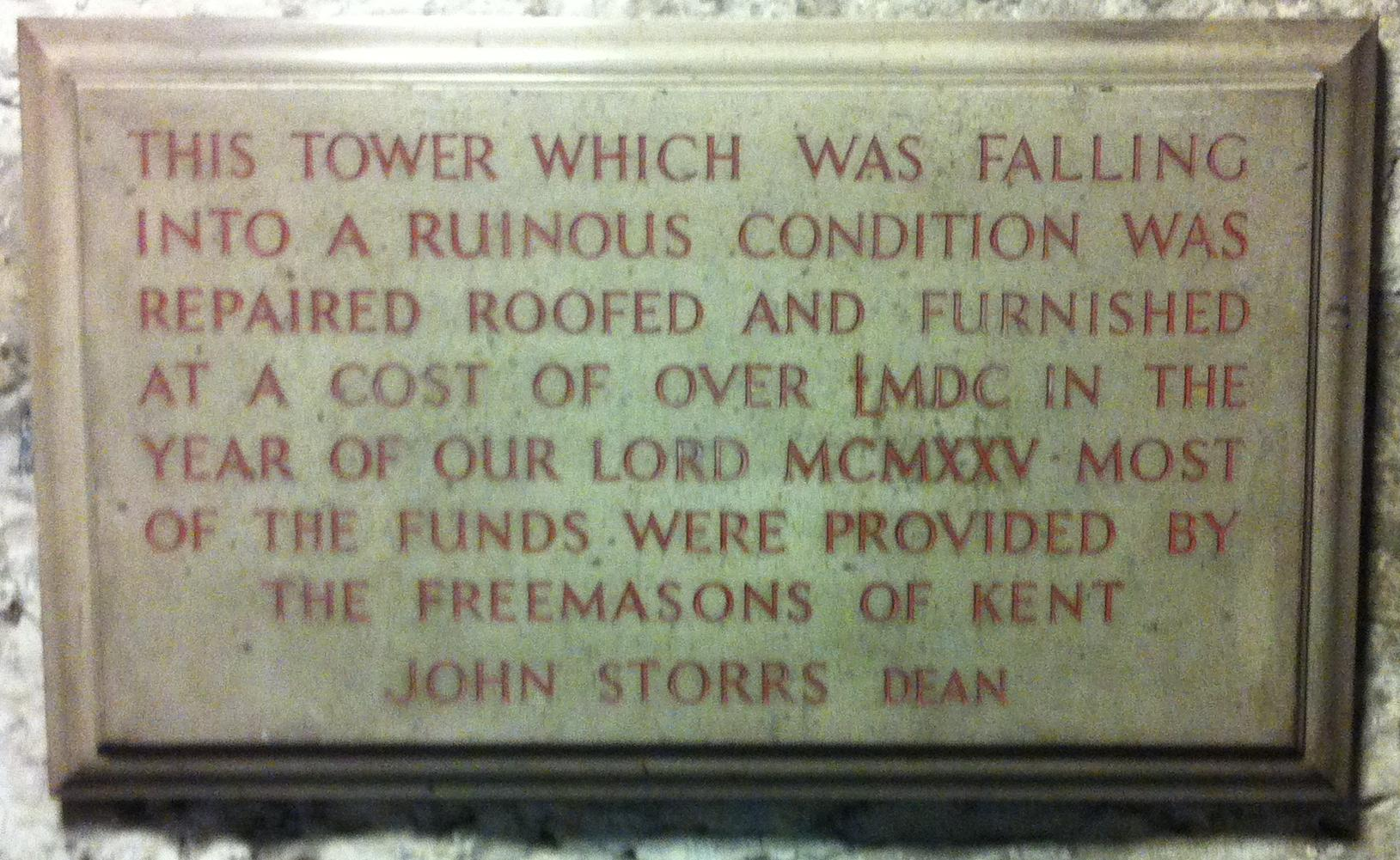
Plaque recording the restoration of the Gundulf Tower

Immediately to the north of the cathedral proper and nestling in between the quire transept, pilgrim steps and sextry gate is the 11th-century Gundulf Tower. This is the oldest part of the cathedral still above ground. Until the 18th century it rose as high as the adjacent parts of the church, some 65 feet. During the 19th century it severely decayed, until by 1897 it was recorded that "only ruins now remain". The lower part of the tower was roofed and the fabric made good in 1925. Most of the cost (£1600) was met by the freemasons. The plaque illustrated to the left is affixed to a wall therein. The three floors are now occupied by the cathedral music department (first floor and top floor) and the vergers (ground floor).

=== Nave ===
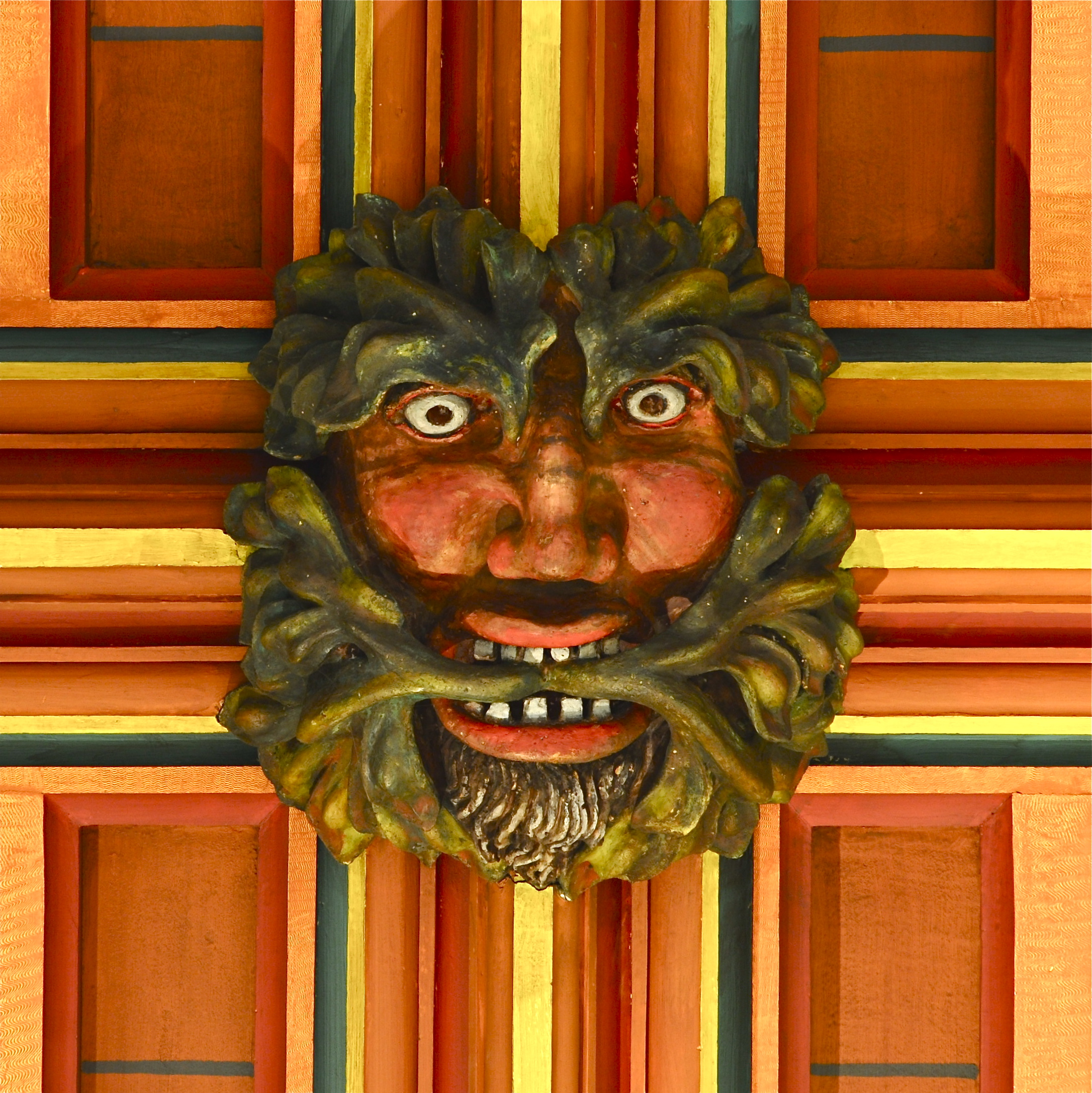
A Green Man roof-boss depicted in the crossing ceiling

The western part of the nave is substantially as Gundulf designed it. The main arcade is topped by a string course below a triforium. The triforium is Norman with a further string course above. The clerestory above is of perpendicular style. From the capitals pilasters rise to the first string course but appear to have been removed from the triforium stage. Originally they might have supported the roof timbers, or even been the springing of a vault.

The easternmost bay of the triforium appears to be Norman, but is the work of 14th-century masons. The final bay of the nave is Decorated in style and leads to the tower piers. Of note is the north pier which possibly contains the Oratory Chapel mentioned above.

The aisles are plain with flat pilasters. The eastern two bays are Decorated with springing for vaulting. Whether the vault was ever constructed is unknown, the present wooden roof extends the full length of the aisles.

The crossing is bounded to the east by the quire screen with the organ above. This is of 19th-century work and shows figures associated with the early cathedral. Above the crossing is the central tower, housing the bells and above that the spire. The ceiling of the crossing is notable for the four Green Men carved on the bosses. Visible from the ground is the outline of the trapdoor through which bells can be raised and lowered when required. The floor is stepped up to the pulpitum and gives access to the quire through the organ screen.

=== North transept ===
The north transept is from 1235 in Early English style. The Victorian insertion of windows has been mentioned above in the external description. Dominating the transept is the baptistery fresco. The fresco by Russian artist Sergei Fyodorov is displayed on the eastern wall. It is located within an arched recess. The recess may have been a former site of the altar of St Nicholas from the time of its construction in 1235 until it was moved to the screen before the pulpitum in 1322. A will suggests that "an altar of Jesu" also stood here at some point, an altar of some sort must have existed as evidenced by the piscina to the right of the recess. The vaulting is unusual in being octpartite, a development of the more common sexpartite. The Pilgrim Door is now the main visitor entrance and is level for disabled access.

=== South transept and Lady Chapel ===
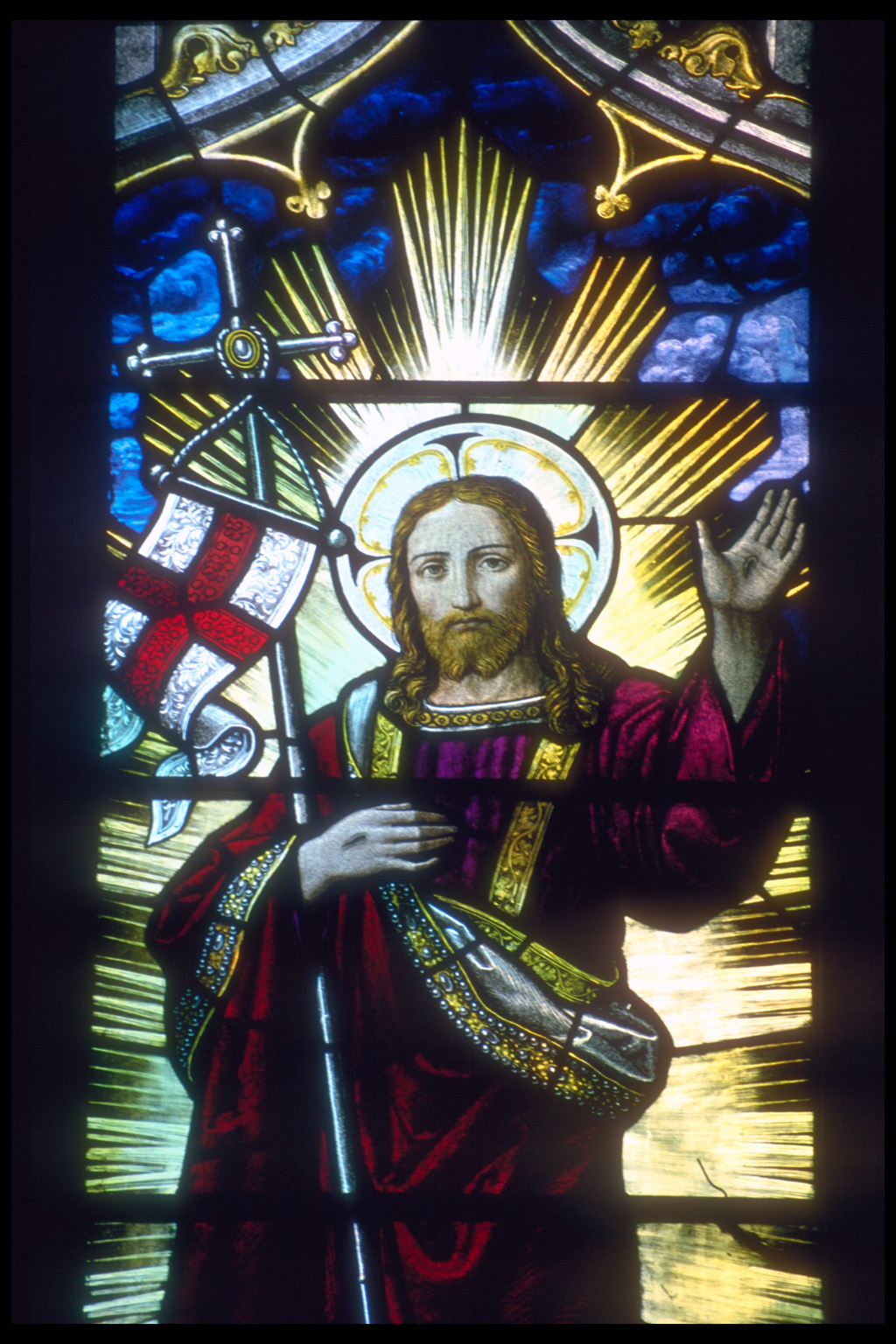
Stained glass from inside the cathedral showing the risen Christ with the cross of St George

The original Lady Chapel was formed in the south transept by screening it off from the crossing. The altar of the Blessed Virgin Mary was housed in the eastern arch of the transept. There are traces of painting both on the east wall and under the arch. The painting delineates the location of the mediaeval north screen of the Lady Chapel. Around 1490 this chapel was extended westwards by piercing the western wall with a large arch and building the chapel's nave against the existing south aisle of cathedral. From within the Lady Chapel the upper parts of two smaller clerestory windows may be seen above the chapel's chancel arch. Subsequently, a screen was placed under the arch and the modern Lady Chapel formed in the 1490 extension.

The south transept is of early Decorated style. The eastern wall of it is a single wide arch at the arcade level. There are two doorways in the arch, neither of which is used, the northern one being hidden by the memorial to William Franklin. The south wall starts plain but part way up is a notable monument to Richard Watts, a "coloured bust, with long gray beard". According to Palmer there used to be a brass plaque to Charles Dickens below this but only the outline exists, the plaque having been moved to the east wall of the quire transept. The west wall is filled by the large arch mentioned above with the screen below dividing it from the present Lady Chapel.

The Lady Chapel as it now exists is of Decorated style with three lights along southern wall and two in the west wall. The style is a light and airy counterpart to the stolid Norman work of the nave. The altar has been placed against the southern wall resulting in a chapel where the congregation wraps around the altar. The window stained glass is modern and tells the gospel story.

The first, easternmost, window has the Annunciation in the upper light: Gabriel speaking to Mary (both crowned) with the Holy Spirit as a dove descending. The lower light shows the Nativity with the Holy Family, three angels and shepherds. The next window shows St Elizabeth in the upper light surrounded by stars and the sun in splendour device. The lower light shows the Adoration of the Magi with Mary enthroned with the Infant. The final window of the south wall has St Mary Magdelene with her ointment surrounded by Tudor roses and fleurs-de-lis in the upper light with the lower light showing the Presentation in the Temple. The west wall continues with St. Margaret of Scotland in the upper light surrounded by fouled anchor and thistle roundels. The reference is to the original dedication of the cathedral as the Priory of St Andrew. The lower light shows the Crucifixion with Mary and St Peter. The final window is unusual, the upper light is divided in three and shows King Arthur with the royal arms flanked by St George on the left and St Michael on the right. The lower light shows the Ascension: two disciples to the left, three women with unguents to the right and three bare crosses top right.

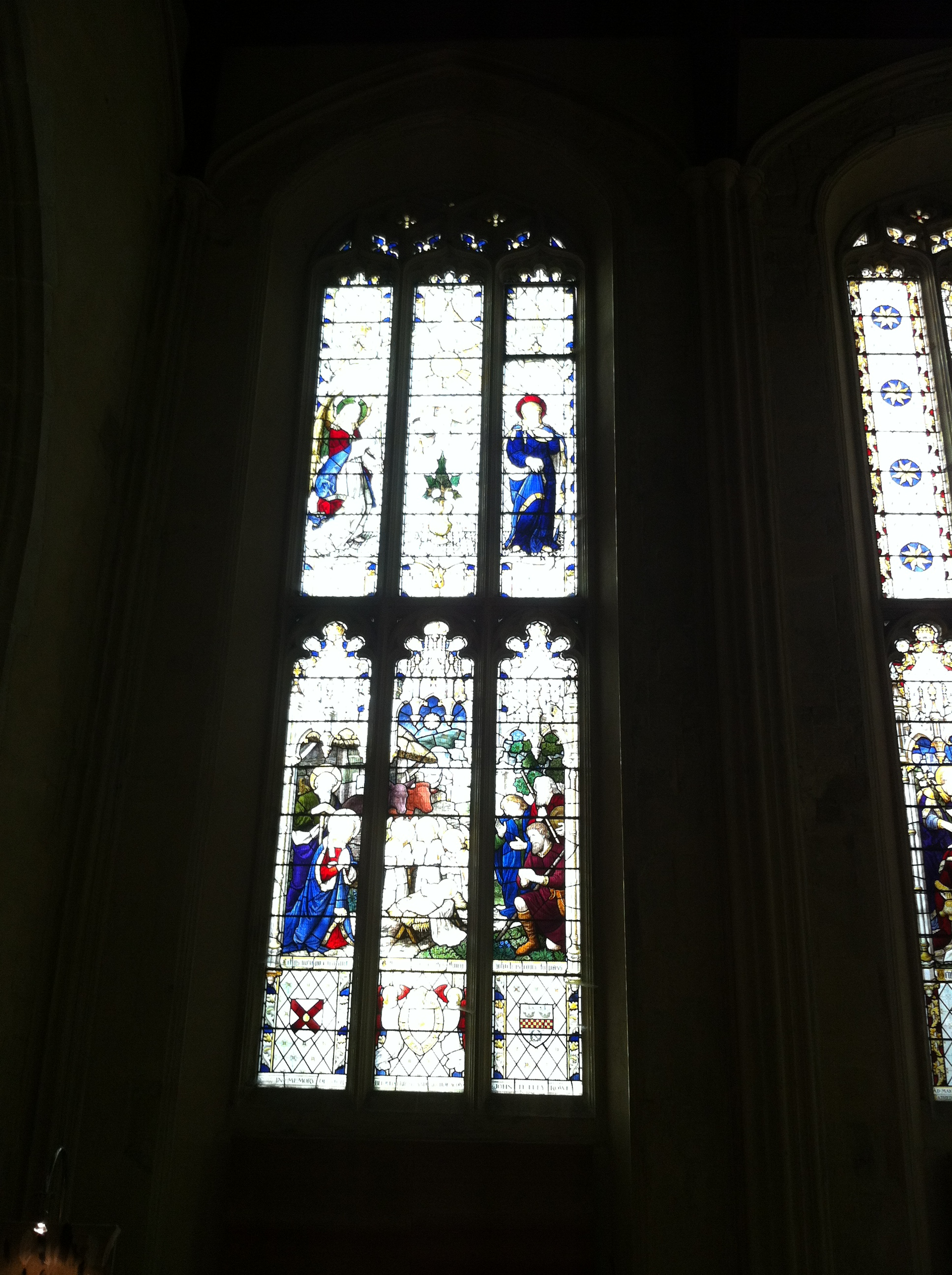
The Annunciation and
The Nativity

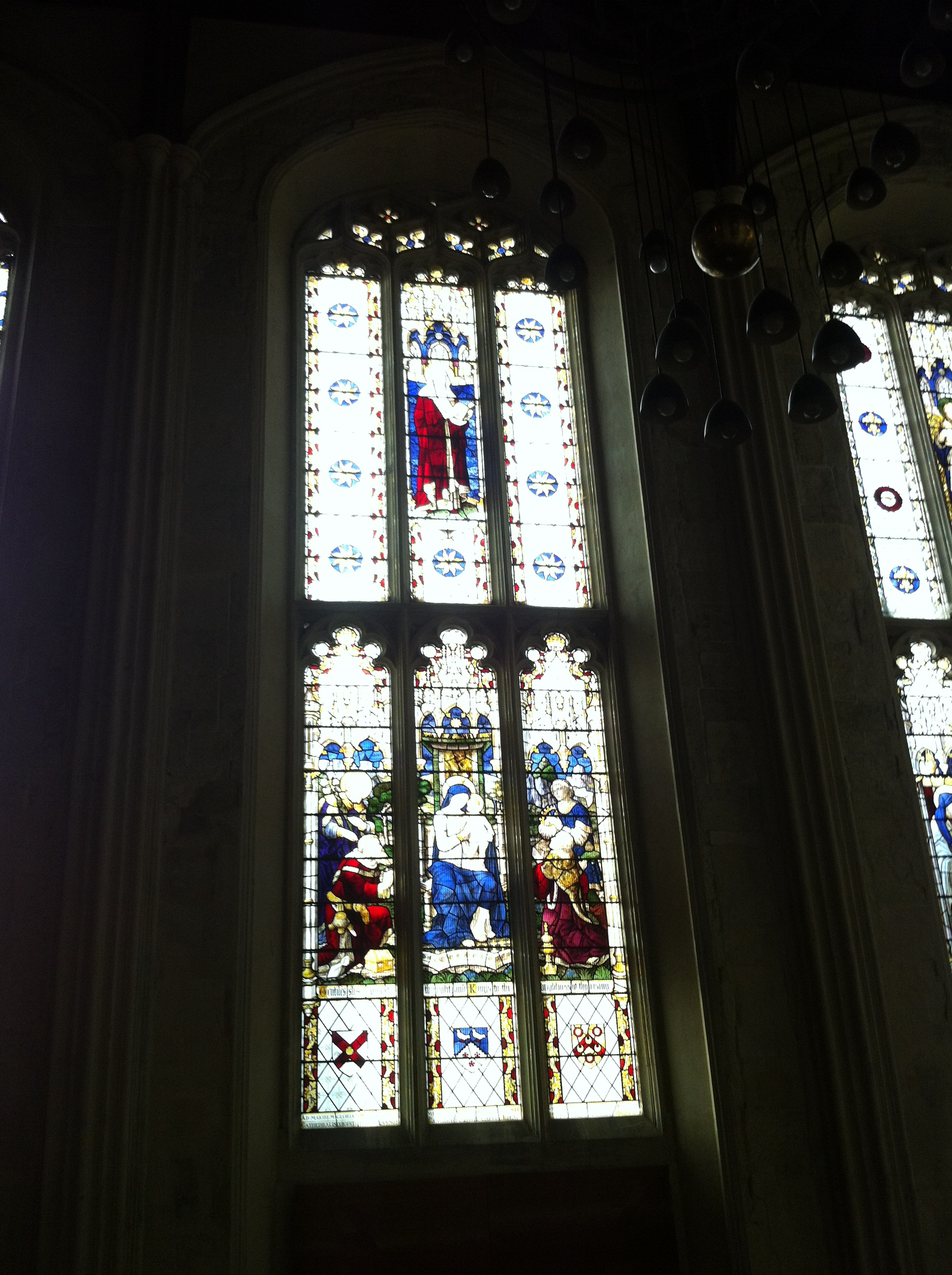
St Elizabeth and
The Adoration of the Magi

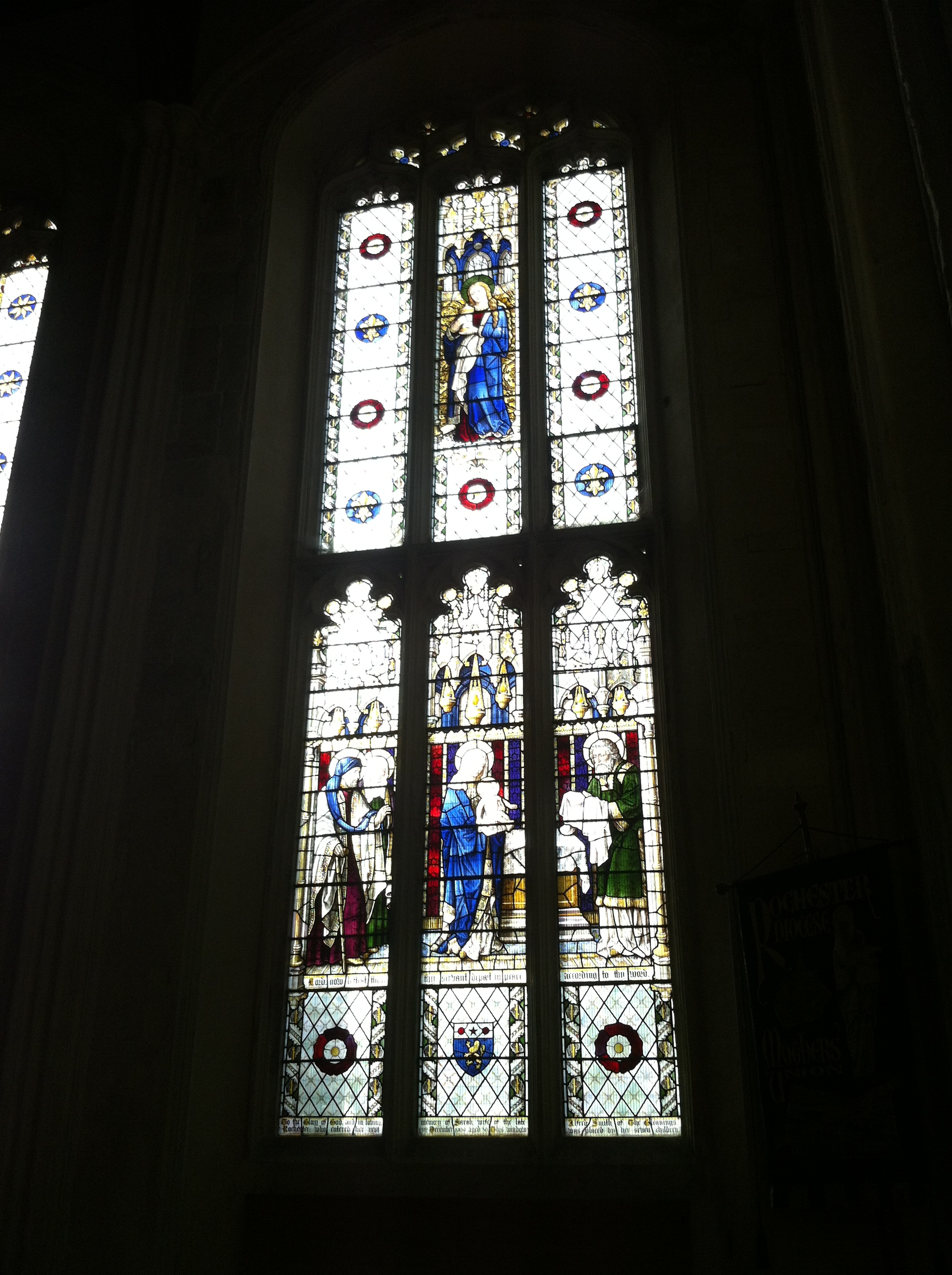
St Mary Magdelene and The Presentation at the Temple

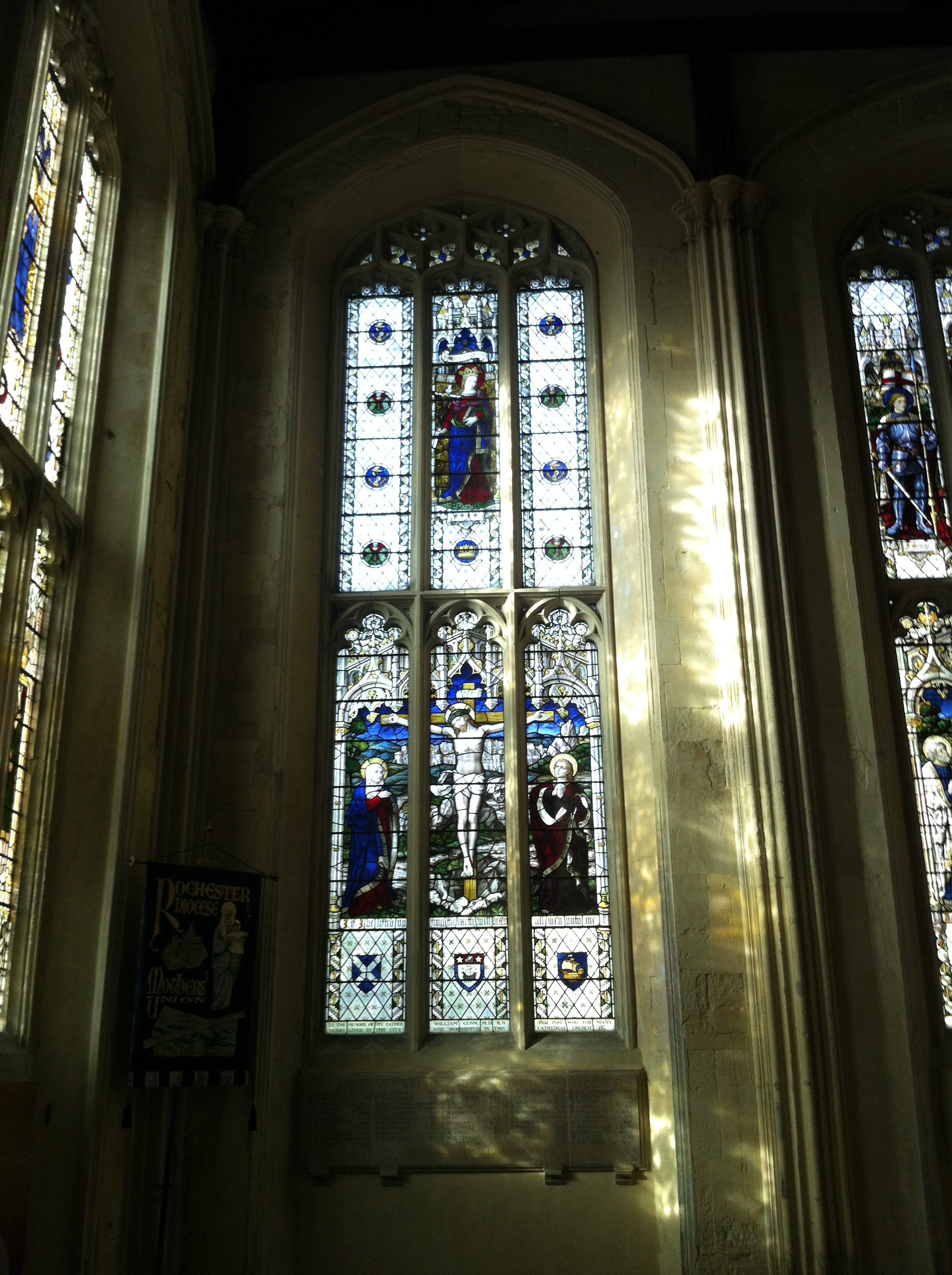
St Margaret of Scotland and The Crucifixion

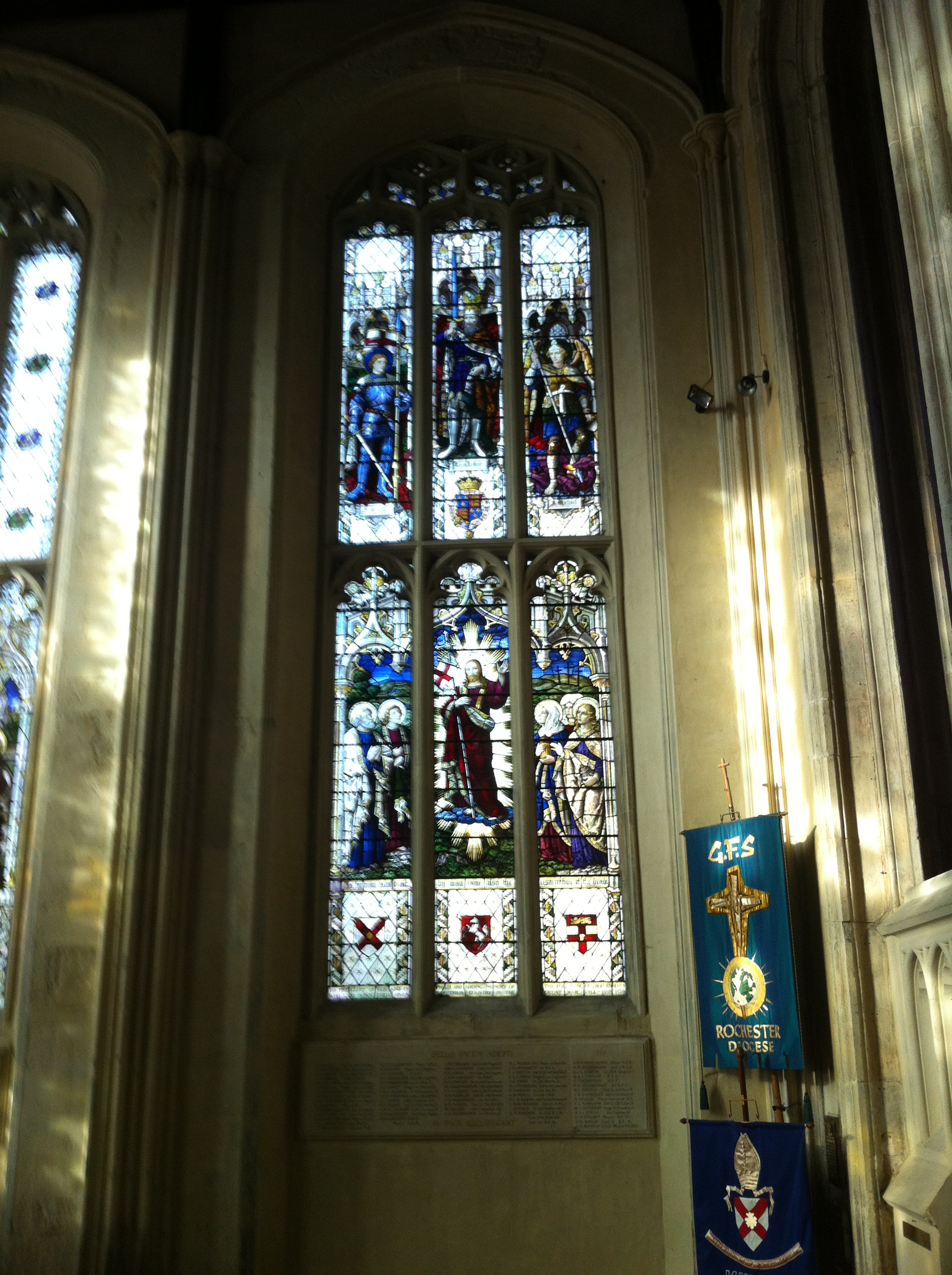
King Arthur and
The Ascension

The first four windows have various dedications in the lower border, but the fifth has the cathedral, Kent and Rochester arms interspaced with the dedication: "To the Glory of God and in proud and abiding memory of the following Old Roffensians | who laid down their lives for their country in the Great War 1914–1918". Below is a stone tablet with their names inscribed. Under the fourth window is a slightly later tablet recording those of 1939–45.

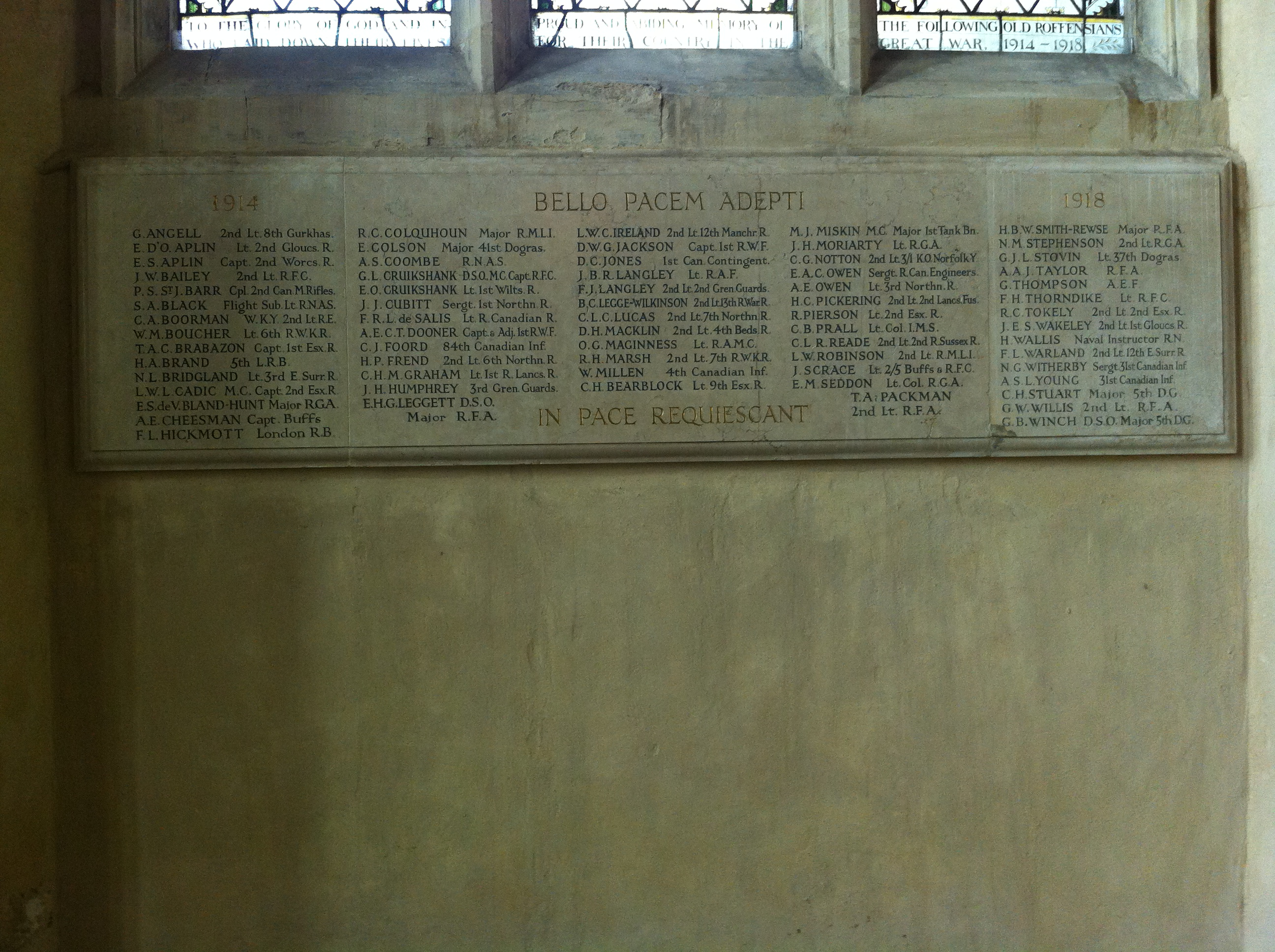
WW I memorial tablet

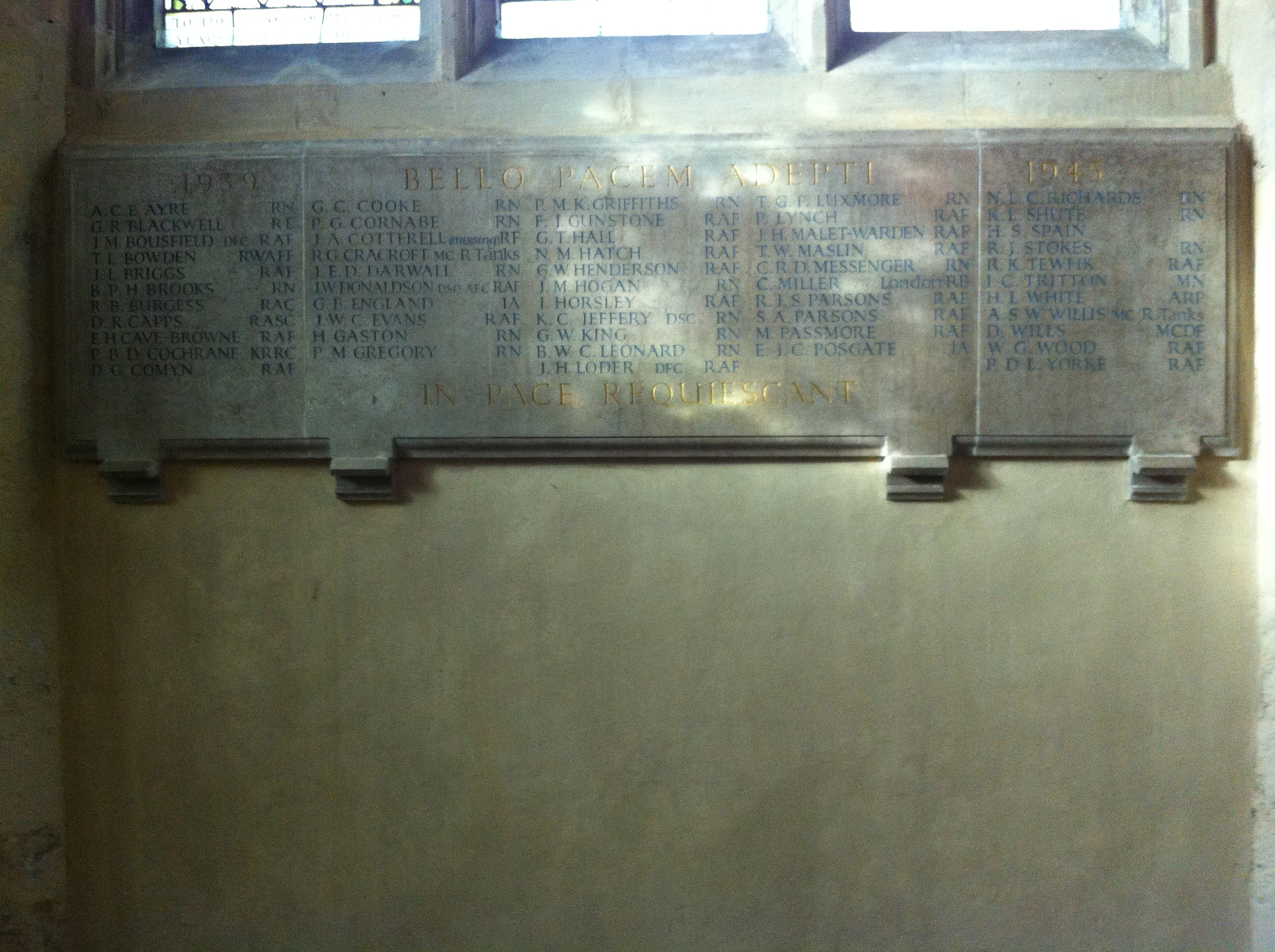
WW II memorial tablet

=== Quire, aisles and transepts ===
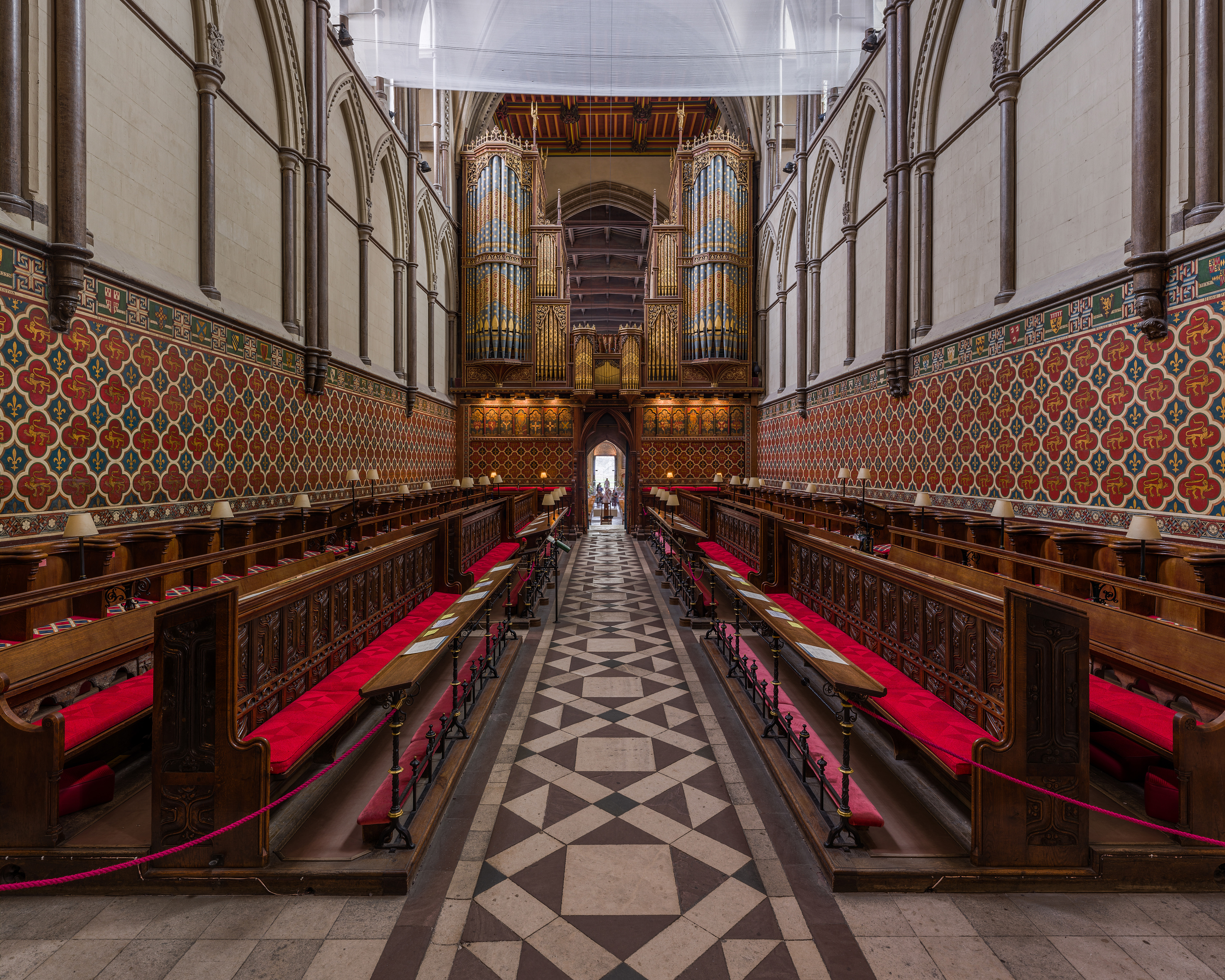
The quire looking west towards the nave

The eastern part of the church is the old monastic area. It is walled off from the public parts by the organ screen, side walls to the quire and cross walls in both aisles. The riots in 1327 are considered part of the cause, but this coincided with a general trend to wall off monasteries.

The north aisle is a simple passageway interrupted by a flight of steps and the cross wall. The steps form part of the pilgrimage route to St William's shrine (hence their designation as "The Pilgrim Steps") and are so worn by medieval feet that before 1897 they had to have wooden treads added.

The south aisle was originally the same width as the northern one. The 14th-century cross wall is still visible filling the arch to the east, now forming the entrance to the vestry over the crypt entrance. Gundulf's small tower occupied what is now the south western portion of the aisle. To keep the cloisters uniform, a wall was established from the tower to what is now the cathedral library. When the tower was demolished its base along with the enclosed area was incorporated into the south aisle. The new "Kent Steps" lead up from the widened aisle into the quire transept, whilst the old entrance now gives access to the crypt below.

Archaeological investigations in 2014 revealed an earlier Norman structure underneath the "Kent Steps". The foundations of the existing (14th-century) wall have been discovered to be Norman. A doorway from the crypt led to a flight of stairs running upwards with a window looking out into the cloisters. This work dates from the first phase of the present cathedral. The detailed report is expected to be published in late 2016.

Before the Victorian renovations the quire had steeply stepped stalls and a pulpit. Removal of these revealed the medieval Rota Fortunae ("Wheel of Life") painting and the original patterning of the walls. The existing wall pattern is modern, being a copy of that found, but the painting's main subject is untouched. Above the painted walls the triforium is blind arched with the clerestory and sextipartite vaulting above. Some of the earlier timbers have been reused in the stalls, but most of the work is 19th-century.

Before Scott's work the quire stalls continued in their high-backed form and cut off the quire transepts. They are now open and form a single space to accommodate a larger congregation when required. The south transept has two openings which no longer lead anywhere; one originally led to the crypt (before the south aisle was widened), (Note: This dating may need modification in the light of the finding of the other end of the stairs during the 2015 archaeological investigations. Report awaited.) the other led up to the Indulgence Chamber.

The north transept was the site of St. William's shrine and the center of pilgrimage in the Middle Ages. Of St William's shrine little now remains. Edward Hasted refers to a "large stone chest, much defaced", Palmer notes that the tomb in the easternmost bay of the transept is "reputed to be that of St. William". The shrine was originally in the centre of the floor. The whole transept used to be known as St William's Chapel, the railed off area to the east being later called St John the Baptist's Chapel and more lately the Warner Chapel on account of the monuments therein. Tucked into a corner of the Warner Chapel is a cross of nails. In the centre of the north wall is the resting place of Walter de Merton, former bishop and founder of Merton College. Two wooden doors are visible, one of which leads nowhere, access now being from the other side of the wall; the other leads to the cathedral treasury. This latter is reputed to be one of the oldest doors still in use in England.

The north quire transept and presbytery form a stylistic whole. The east end however has been substantially remodelled by Scott. The arcading contains the tombs of various past bishops, that between the Warner Chapel and the presbytery is unusually well preserved. It is the tomb of de Sheppey which was walled up at some point and forgotten about. As a result, it escaped the depredations of the English Commonwealth. The tomb was rediscovered, uncovered and restored by Cottingham from 1825 to 1840.

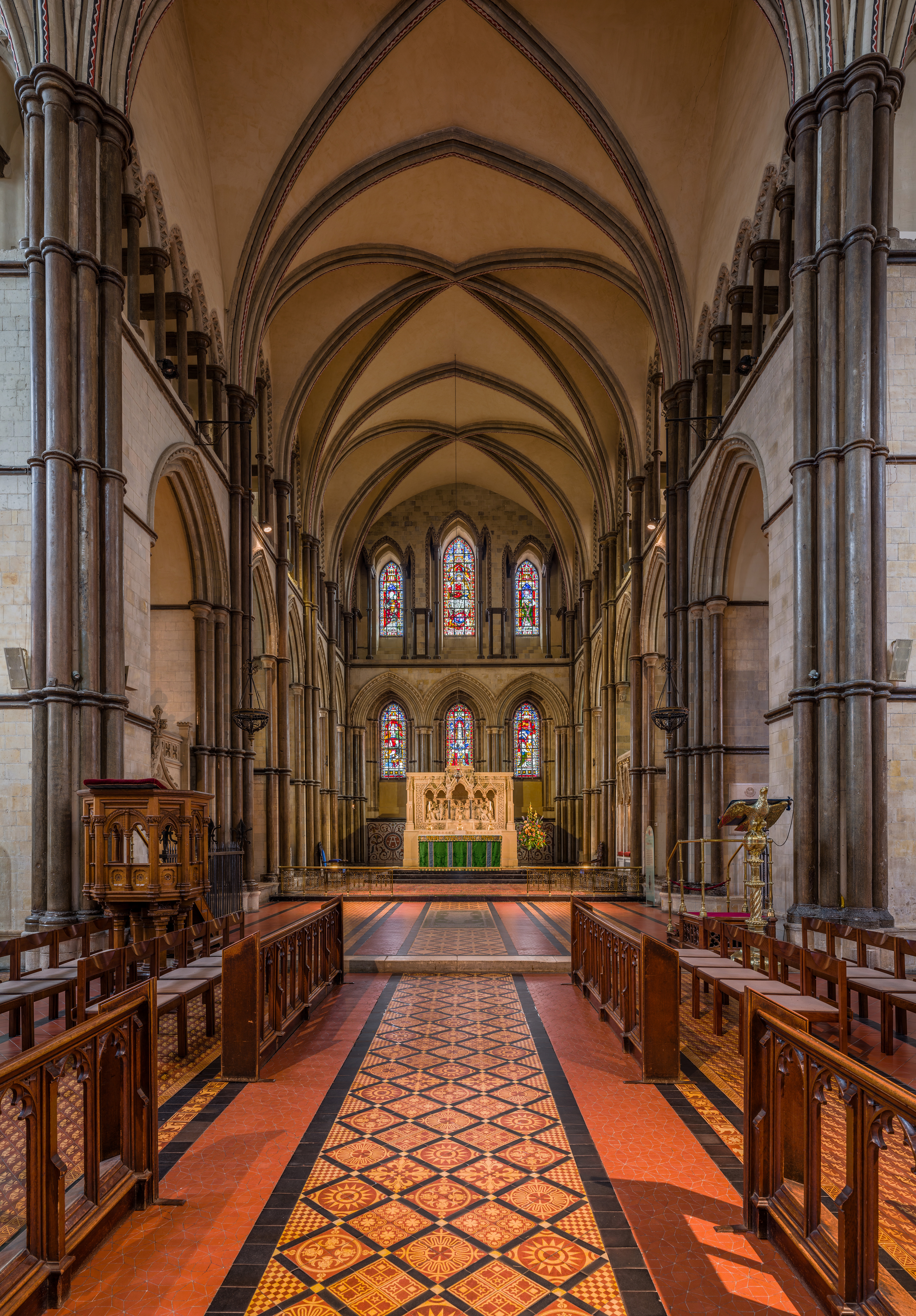
Rochester Cathedral presbytery

=== Chapter room doorway ===
The chapter room doorway

The doorway to the chapter room and present library is described variously as "magnificent", "elaborate", and "one of the finest examples of English Decorated architecture in existence" by scholars who have visited and studied the cathedral. The two full length figures either side of the door represent the New and Old Covenant. The latter is a female figure with a broken staff and the tables of the law held upside down, blindfold to symbolise ignorance of the Messiah. The former is a female holding a cross and church. Palmer notes that Cottingham's 1825–30 restoration work added the head of a "mitred, bearded bishop", but examination today reveals nothing of this.

Above these two are four great Doctors of the Church: Ss Augustine, Gregory, Jerome and Ambrose. They are depicted seated at reading desks and lecterns. Above, on each side, are a pair of angels bearing scrolls and ascending from flames. The uppermost figure in the arch is a small nude figure. This is symbolic of a purified soul arising from Purgatory upwards towards a canopy, possibly the gates of Heaven. It may be Hamo de Hythe who commissioned the doorway. Above the canopy the ogee outer arch rises to a final pinnacle bearing a pedestal. Today there is no figure upon this pedestal. The outer arch is decorated with deeply undercut foliage. The spandrels and the areas under the figures are filled with diaper work, themselves noteworthy.

=== Crypt ===
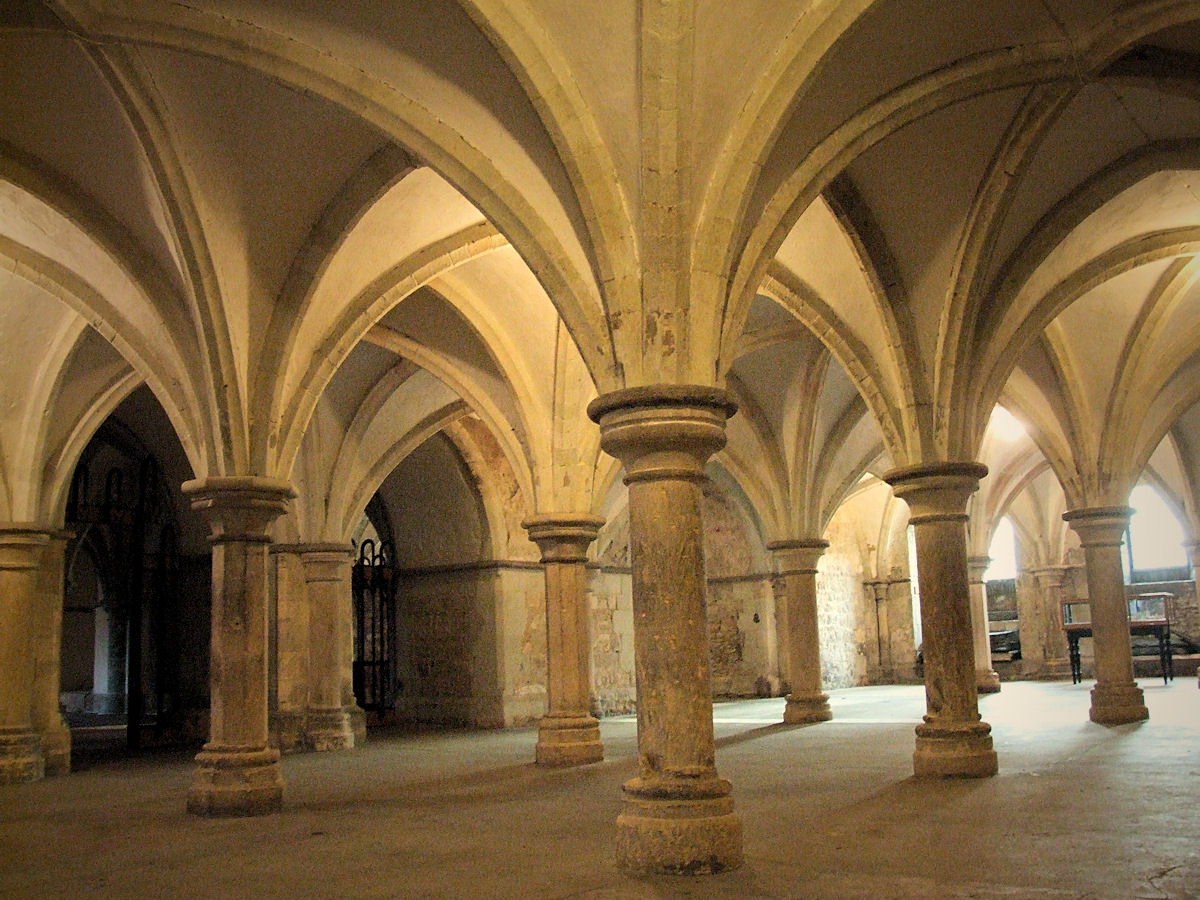
Crypt looking towards the south quire transept from the quire crossing

The oldest part of the crypt is the two westernmost bays under the eastern end of the quire. It is part of the original 1080s construction with typical Romanesque groin vaulting springing from plain capitals atop quite slender plain shafts. The rest of the crypt is from a century later. The plinths, shafts and capitals are in the same style as the earlier work, but quadripartite rib vaulting was used. Owing to the oblong shape of the bays, the shorter transverse arches are pointed. In places remnants of the mediaeval paintwork are visible in the vaulting. More medieval paintwork is visible in the east end window openings.

The eastern part of the crypt under the presbytery is a chapel dedicated to St Ithamar. Except when used for the Sunday Club (for young people) during Sunday Eucharist, it is reserved as a place of quiet and stillness for private prayer and reflection. Access to the crypt is down a flight of stairs from the south quire aisle. A wheelchair lift installed in 2017 provides disabled access. In 2014, as part of the addition of disabled access and the change of use of the crypt, the whole of the crypt floor was removed and the area under it investigated by archaeologists. A Roman house and the foundations of the original east end were uncovered.

== Music ==
=== Organ ===
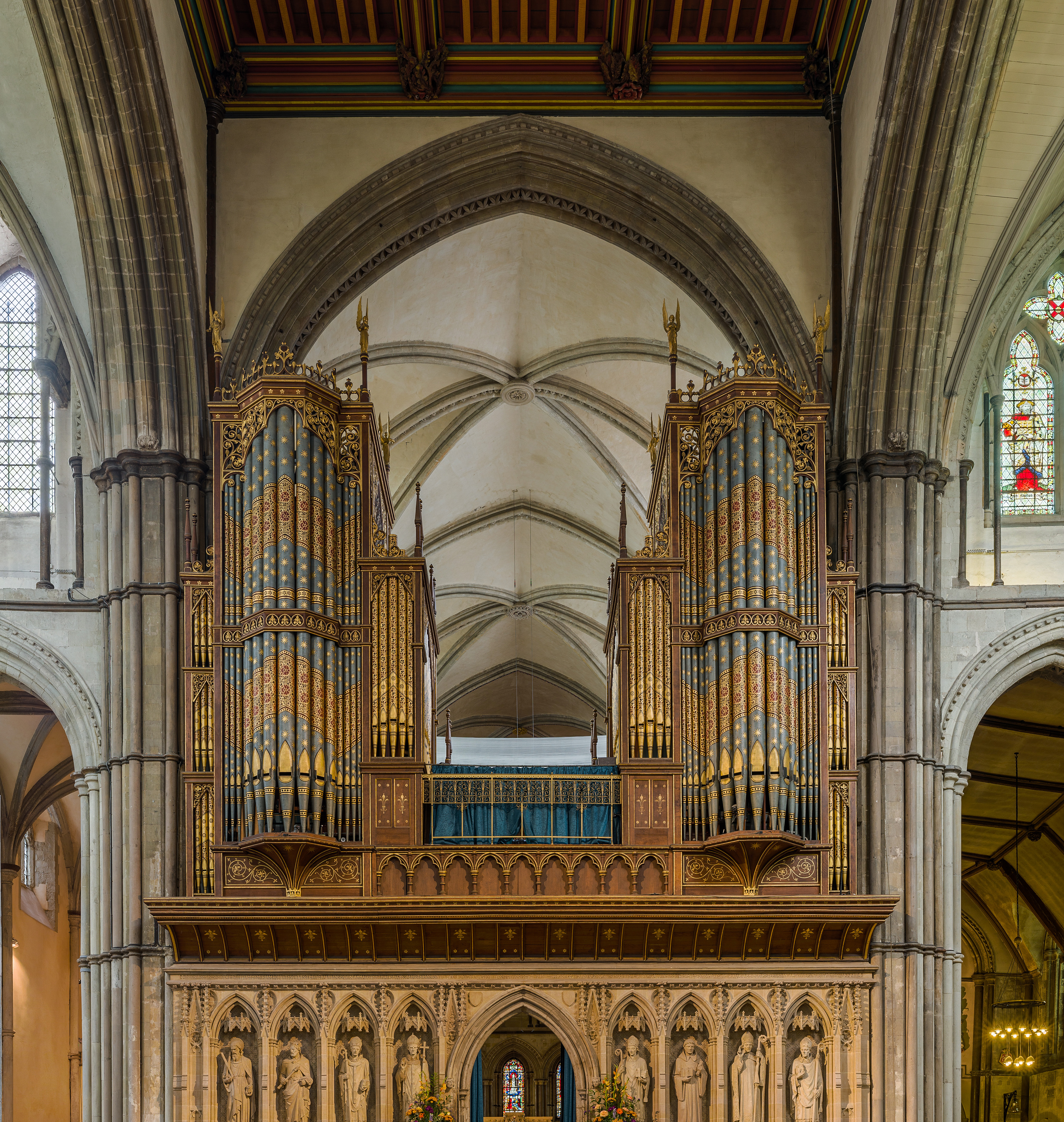
Pipe organ above the screen

Rochester Cathedral's current pipe organ originates from the 1905 instrument built by J. W. Walker & Sons Ltd. It was later rebuilt by Mander Organs in 1989, who installed a new choir organ and pipework under the advice of Paul Hale.

=== Organists ===
James Plomley is listed as organist at Rochester in 1559. Among the composers, conductors and concert performers who have been organists at Rochester Cathedral are Bertram Luard-Selby, Harold Aubie Bennett, Percy Whitlock and William Whitehead.

=== Choirs ===
The cathedral choir traces its roots back to the church's foundation in AD 604. The quality of the chorister training was praised by the Venerable Bede in his Ecclesiastical History of the English People.

==== Main choir ====
The main choir consists of the boy choristers, girl choristers and the lay clerks. The provision of boy choristers was why King's School was founded in 604, at the same time as the cathedral itself. It still supplies boys from its preparatory school to sing the treble line. The boys' choir do multiple services weekly. From 1995 a girls' choir was introduced to sing some of the services for which the boys were not available. Girls now do alternate weekends; the boys' choir will do one week and the girls' choir will do another, and weekly Monday services. Girls are drawn from any of the local schools. There are currently 18 boy choristers and 17 girl choristers. The lay clerks are professional singers who provide the lower three voices: alto, tenor and bass. For great services, all three parts of the choir may combine.

==== Voluntary choir ====
The present choir was formed in August 2008 from the previous auditioned adult voluntary choir. The voluntary choir sings for around 10 weekends per year, usually during holiday periods when the child choristers are unavailable. They also sing in lieu of the main choir at the Eucharist as required.

=== Bells ===
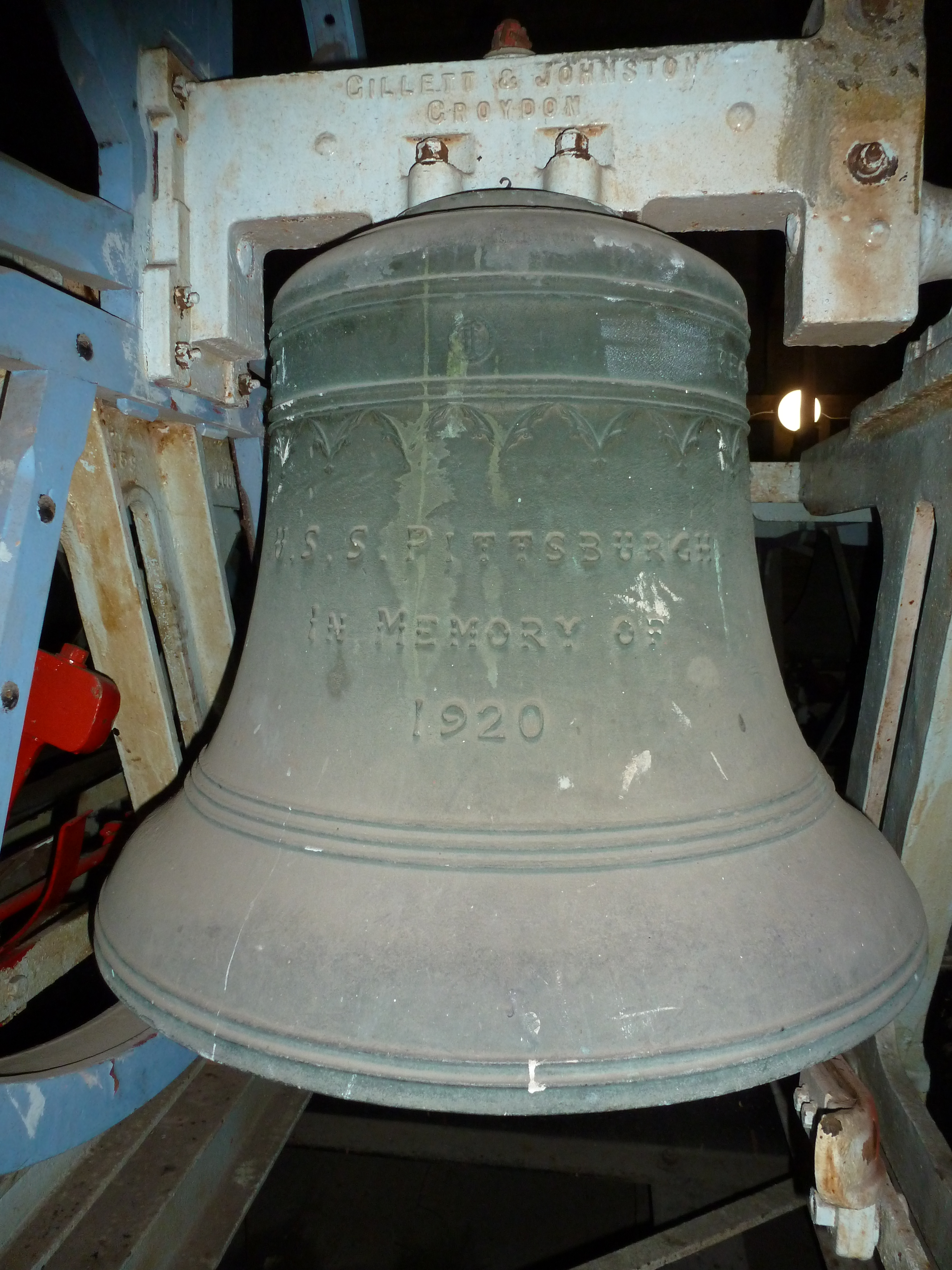
Number 3 bell with USS Pittsburgh memorial inscription (diameter measures 30 inches (760 mm))

Rochester Cathedral has a ring of 10 bells hung for change ringing in the English style. All were cast in 1921, some as memorials to men lost in the First World War or Great War. The heaviest bell is 30 long cwt 14 lb (3,374 lb or 1,530 kg) tuned to D.

Although it is probable that the original Saxon cathedral of 604 had one or more bells, early records are scant. The 11th-century Gundulf Tower has architectural features which indicate bells were placed there from the start. In 1154 Prior Reginald made two bells and recast a third, existing, cracked one. Two further bells were obtained during the 12th century as mentioned in the Custumale Roffense of c. 1300. In 1343, Hamo de Hythe arranged for the central tower to be heightened and hung four bells called "Dunstanus, Paulinus, Itmarus atque Lanfrancus" (Dunstan, Paulinus, Itamar and Lanfranc).

In 1635 the third was recast and in 1683 the fifth and tenor, followed by the treble in 1695. The fourth was noted as cracked in 1711 and a quotation obtained from Richard Phelps. The contract went the following year to James Bagley who also quarter turned the second: "the striking sides being much worn". The 1695 treble was recast in 1770 and the 1683 tenor recast in 1834. In 1904 two further bells were added at the time that the tower and spire were rebuilt. Of the original six bells four were recast and two retained. In 1921 all the bells were recast and augmented to the current ring of 10. When bells are recast the original metal is reused with new metal added as required, therefore there is every reason to assume that the current bells contain the metal from all the original bells back to the time of Gundulf. In 1960 the bells were rehung on a new steel frame by John Taylor.

The service of dedication for the new bells was held on 16 May 1921. After prayers, the bells were rung for one minute, before the service resumed. Following the service touches of Grandsire caters and Stedman caters were rung. 15 members of the cathedral band and 31 visitors all took turns ringing. Because the bells are a memorial ring, including men who had died in the Great War, they were rung half-muffled on this first occasion.

For many years the reason why the number 3 bell bears the inscription "U.S.S. Pittsburgh in Memory of 1920" was a mystery. (Note: An earlier version of Love's Guide to the Church Bells of Kent states "Note that there is a mystery regarding the inscription on the rear of the 3rd. The USS Pittsburgh had nothing to do with Rochester Cathedral, and perhaps the inscription appears by mistake.") However a letter from James W. Todd, officer commanding USS Pittsburgh was published in the Chatham News on 17 December 1920. In it he thanks the Dean of Rochester for various events during the two and a half months that the USS Pittsburgh was in dry-dock at Chatham. He encloses a cheque for £52 10s to pay for the recasting of the bell and discusses the inscription.

== Dean and chapter ==
As of 30 December 2020:

- Dean – Philip Hesketh (since 19 June 2016 installation)
- Canon Precentor – Matthew Rushton (since 25 March 2017 installation)
- Priest-in-Charge, Borstal and Diocesan Canon – Sue Brewer (canon since 9 September 2018 installation)
- Diocesan Director of Formation & Ministry and Diocesan Canon – Chris Dench (residentiary canon since 9 September 2018 installation)
- Canon Chancellor – Gordon Giles (since 13 September 2020 installation)

== Notable people ==
Grevile Marais Livett, a longtime precentor of the cathedral and later vicar of Wateringbury, authored several books and monographs on the Norman churches of England as well as contributing extensively to Archaeologia Cantiana, the journal of the Kent Archaeology Society. (Livett's name was a variant of Levett, an old Sussex and Kentish family.)

The author Charles Dickens had wished to be buried in the churchyard at Rochester Cathedral, but his body was interred at Poets' Corner inside Westminster Abbey.

=== Notable burials ===
- Sarah Baker (c1735-1816), actress and theatre manager
- Francis Barrell (1662–1724)
- Paulinus of York, first Bishop of York, third Bishop of Rochester and saint
- Ithamar, first English bishop of Saxon-birth, fourth Bishop of Rochester and saint
- Walter de Merton, Bishop of Rochester and founder of Merton College, Oxford
- John Sheppey, Lord High Treasurer and Bishop of Rochester, buried under the altar of St John the Baptist
- John Somers, Elizabethan diplomat and custodian of Mary, Queen of Scots.
- John Hilsey, Bishop of Rochester
- John Warner, Bishop of Rochester, buried in the Merton Chapel.
- Major General Francis Henry Kelly
- Richard Watts

== Library ==
The Anglo-Saxon establishment no doubt contained an early library, but no details of it have survived. When Gundulf established the priory in 1082 it was as a Benedictine house. As reading forms a part of the daily routine as laid down in the Rule of Saint Benedict it may be assumed that there was a library by then. By the time of Gundulf's death in 1108 the number of monks had risen from the original 22 to over 60, implying a sizeable library.

In the Textus Roffensis of 1130 a catalogue of the library is included within it. There was the famous Gundulf Bible (now in the Huntington Library, California); the Textus itself; scriptural commentaries; treatises by various Church Fathers; historical works (including Bede's Ecclesiastical History) and assorted books on monastic life. Most books were in Latin, with just a few in Anglo-Saxon. One hundred and sixteen books are named, with a further 11 added later. These were volumes; some would contain multiple works within them. A further catalogue compiled in 1202 records 280 volumes. This latter catalogue was only rediscovered in the 19th century. It had been written on two leaves at the beginning of a copy of St Augustine's De Doctrina Christiana belonging to Rochester. The copy is now in the British Library.

The mediaeval library was located in different parts of the cathedral and precincts at different times. The precentor was in charge of it and also responsible for providing the materials needed to enable copyists, illuminators and authors' work. Because all copying was by hand and taught locally, monasteries varied in their style. There is an identifiable "Rochester Script" of the 12th century.

When King John besieged the castle (1215) some manuscripts were lost, and more were too in 1264 when Simon de Montfort occupied the City of Rochester.

The dissolution of the monasteries was catastrophic for the cathedral library. John Leland, Royal Librarian and antiquary, complained to Thomas Cromwell that young German scholars were cutting documents out of books in the cathedral libraries. Leland was able to save some manuscripts and 99 from Rochester are now in the Royal Collection in the British Museum. 37 other works have been traced in England, Scotland, Europe and even the United States.

Following the Dissolution, the Old Vestry to the east of the south quire transept was adopted as the Chapter Room and library. Notwithstanding its change in designation, it is still used from time to time as a vestry by the clergy. The only contents to survive the Dissolution were ancient manuscripts, the 50 volumes predating 1540 appear to have been later acquisitions. The library remained smaller than in mediaeval times, as the clergy were less numerous than the monks. The chapter members were required to be "learned and erudite" and possess a university degree, so it is postulated that they would have their own personal books. From the 18th century onwards the library grew, in part due to donations which became traditional upon deans' and canons' appointments. Some legacies were received, notably Richard Poley of Rochester whose grave is at the foot of the Quire Steps. In 1907-9 the east wall of the library was reconstructed, the floor replaced and new bookcases provided by the donation of T. H. Foord, a benefactor of both the city and cathedral.

=== Notable contents ===
The Textus Roffensis, mentioned above, is now on display in Rochester Cathedral. The Custumale Roffense dates from around 1300 and gives (in Latin) information about the priory's income and domestic arrangements. Instructions are given for the ringing of bells, confirming their use at this date. There is a copy of St Augustine's (Note: Augustine of Hippo (354–430), not Augustine of Canterbury (c.530–604).) De Consensu Evangelistarum ("On the Harmony of the Evangelists") copied in the first half of the 12th century. It is in its medieval binding, and from its script it is clear that the copy was made at Rochester. Also from Rochester is Peter Lombard's Book of Sentences (Questiones Theologicae) from the late 13th century. There are a number of medieval charters.

There is a Complutensian Polyglot Bible (Greek, Latin and Hebrew) printed in Spain in 1514–17. A Sarum Missal of 1534 came from Paris. Rochester has a copy of Coverdale's Bible from 1535, a Great Bible of 1539, a Bishop's Bible of 1568 and numerous other later copies. The Bishop's Bible is notable for the note at Psalm xlv.9: "Ophir is thought to be the Ilande in the west coast, of late found by Christopher Colombo, from whence at this day is brought most fine gold."

== Disabled access ==
Disabled access is via the north door into the nave transept. In the south quire aisle is a wheelchair lift over part of the "Kent Steps". This gives access to the quire and presbytery level; there is a disabled WC near the foot of this. Plans to introduce a lift in 2014 were abandoned because a Norman staircase was uncovered in its proposed location.

== King's Engineers ==
Gundulf, a monk from the Abbey of Bec in Normandy came to England in 1070 as Lafranc's chaplain at Canterbury. His talent for architecture had been spotted by William I and was put to good use in Rochester where he was appointed as bishop in 1077. Almost immediately the king appointed him to supervise the construction of the White Tower, now part of the Tower of London in 1078. Under William Rufus he also undertook building work on Rochester Castle. Having served three Kings of England and earning "the favour of then all", Gundulf is accepted as the first "King's Engineer". He died in 1108 and his statue adorns the west door of the cathedral.

Because of his military engineering talent, Gundulf is regarded as the "father of the Corps of Royal Engineers". The corps claims a line of King's Engineers pre-dating the engineers of the Board of Ordnance in 1414 and the formal founding of the Corps in 1716 all the way back to Gundulf. This shared heritage and the close proximity to the cathedral of the Royal School of Military Engineering in Brompton means the Corps of Royal Engineers and Rochester Cathedral maintain strong links to this day.

There are over 25 memorials to individual officers and soldiers of the Corps of Royal Engineers, including that of Lieut John Chard VC, the officer in charge of defending Rorke's Drift against the Zulu onslaught, and a number of memorials representing members of the corps that have given their lives in the discharge of their duty, including many stained glass windows presented by the corps. One such plaque, from 1881, commemorates Major Samuel Anderson, responsible for surveying a large portion of the 49th parallel Canada–United States border in the 1860s and 1870s.

A memorial tablet was erected in 1902 to the memory of three officers, graduates of the Royal Military College of Canada, who died while serving in Africa: Huntly Brodie Mackay, Captain Royal Engineers; William Henry Robinson, Captain Royal Engineers; and William Grant Stairs, Captain the Welsh Regiment.

The latest memorial to the Corps of Royal Engineers was dedicated during the service of remembrance on the Corps Memorial Weekend, 19 September 2010, led by Adrian Newman (then Dean of Rochester; later Bishop of Stepney), in the presence of the Chief Royal Engineer, Peter Wall, and the families of the ten Royal Engineers killed in Afghanistan since September 2009, recipients of military decorations including the Elizabeth Cross.

== See also ==
- List of cathedrals in the United Kingdom
- List of Gothic cathedrals in Europe
- List of bishops of Rochester
- Dean of Rochester
- Architecture of the medieval cathedrals of England
- English Gothic architecture
- Romanesque architecture
- List of ecclesiastical restorations and alterations by J. L. Pearson
