= Hamo Hethe =

Bishop of Rochester (c. 1275–1352)

- Bishop of Rochester
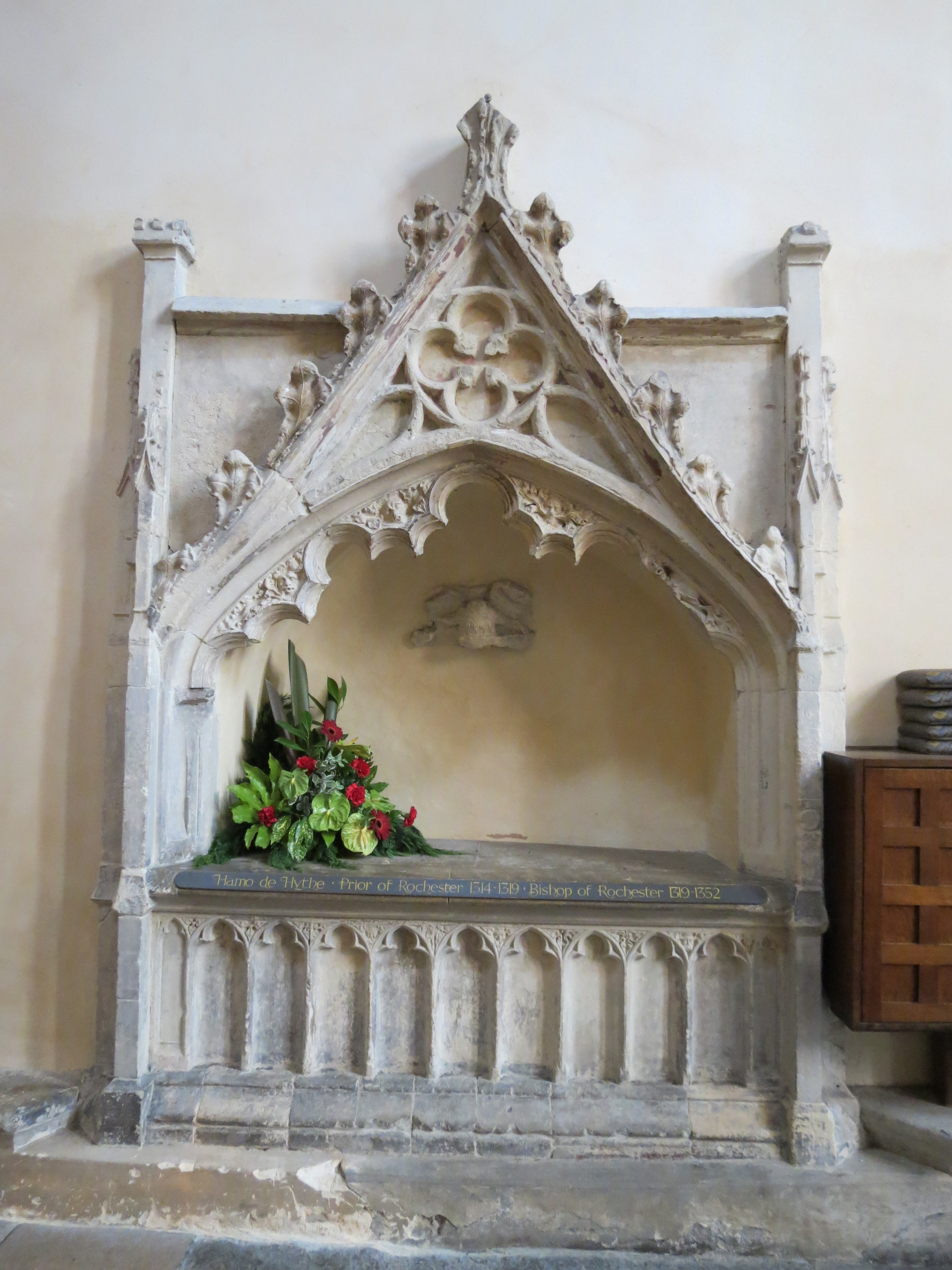
- Elected: 18 March 1317
- Term ended: early 1352
- Predecessor: Thomas Wouldham
- Successor: John Sheppey

Orders
- Consecration: 26 August 1319

Personal details
- Died: 4 May 1352
- Denomination: Catholic

Hamo Hethe was a medieval Bishop of Rochester, England. He was born about 1275 in Centuries, Hythe. He was elected on 18 March 1317 and consecrated on 26 August 1319. He resigned the see early 1352 before his death 4 May 1352.

Hethe, along with Archbishop Melton, John Ross and Stephen Gravesend, alone spoke up in Edward II's defence during the Parliamentary session that deposed Edward.

== Citations ==
Catholic Church titles
Preceded by Thomas Wouldham	Bishop of Rochester; 1317–1352	Succeeded by John Sheppey
