= John Sheppey =

English administrator and bishop (c. 1300–1360)

- Bishop of Rochester
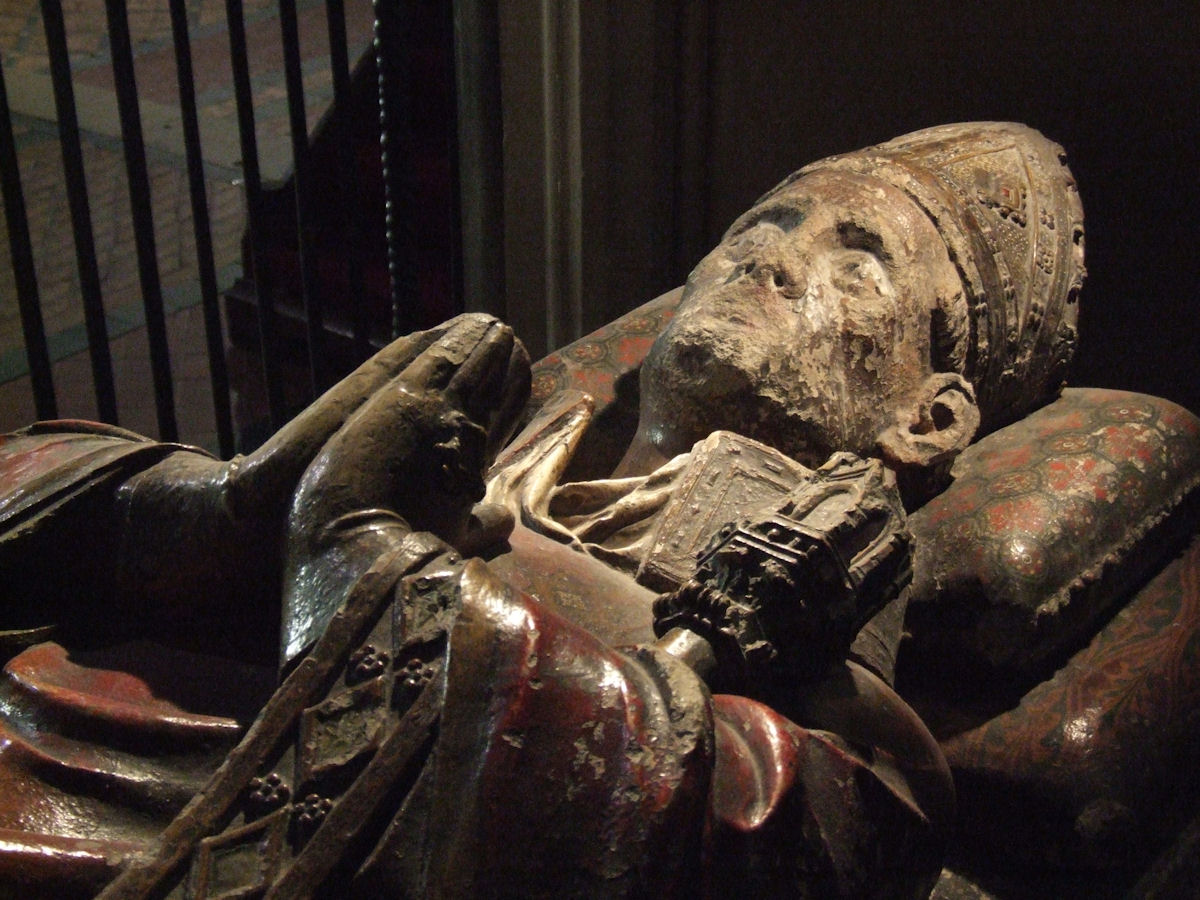
- Rochester Cathedral - Tomb of John de Sheppey
- Appointed: 22 October 1352
- Term ended: 19 October 1360
- Predecessor: Hamo Hethe
- Successor: William Whittlesey

Orders
- Consecration: 10 March 1353

Personal details
- Born: c. 1300
- Died: 19 October 1360
- Denomination: Catholic

John Sheppey (c. 1300 – 19 October 1360) was an English administrator and bishop. He served as treasurer from 1356 to 1360. Little is known of his family and background. A Benedictine, he was ordained deacon in 1318, and later studied at Oxford. Later he became involved in royal government, and was made bishop of Rochester on 22 October 1352. He was consecrated on 10 March 1353. He died on 19 October 1360, and was buried in Rochester Cathedral at the altar of St John the Baptist. As his will shows, he was a friend of his predecessor in the treasury, William Edington.

Sheppey is today remembered mostly for his sermons, many of which still survive.

== Citations ==
Political offices
Preceded by William Edington	Lord High Treasurer; 1356–1360	Succeeded by Simon Langham
Catholic Church titles
Preceded by Hamo Hethe	Bishop of Rochester; 1352–1360	Succeeded by William Whittlesey
