= Curll =

Curll is a surname. Notable people with the surname include:

- Edmund Curll (c.1675–1747), English bookseller and publisher
- Walter Curll or Walter Curle (1575–1647), English bishop
- Curll baronets
