= Godwine =

Godwine or Godwin refers to the following people

- Godwin, Earl of Wessex (d. 1053) Earl of Wessex
- Godwine (floruit 995) (d. c. 1020) Bishop of Rochester
- Godwine (floruit 1013) (d. c. 1052) Bishop of Rochester
