= Ascelin =

Ascelin may refer to:

- Ascelin of Lombardy mid-13th century Papal Ambassador to the Tartars (Mongols)
- Ascelin of Rochester (died 1148) English Bishop of Rochester
- Adalberon, Bishop of Laon (died 1030), French Bishop and poet

== See also ==
- Anselm (disambiguation)
