= Ralph d'Escures =

Archbishop of Canterbury from 1114 to 1122

- Archbishop of Canterbury
- Appointed: 26 April 1114
- Term ended: 20 October 1122
- Predecessor: Anselm of Canterbury
- Successor: William de Corbeil
- Other post: Bishop of Rochester

Orders
- Consecration: 9 August 1108

Personal details
- Died: 20 October 1122 Canterbury
- Buried: Canterbury Cathedral
- Parents: Seffrid d'Escures; Rascendis

Ralph d'Escures (died 20 October 1122) was a medieval Abbot of Séez, Bishop of Rochester, and then Archbishop of Canterbury. He studied at the school at the Abbey of Bec. In 1079 he entered the abbey of St Martin at Séez and became abbot there in 1091. He was a friend of both Archbishop Anselm of Canterbury and Bishop Gundulf of Rochester, whose see, or bishopric, he took over on Gundulf's death.

Ralph was not chosen archbishop of Canterbury by the chapter of Canterbury alone. His election involved an assembly of the lords and bishops meeting with King Henry I of England. Ralph then received his pallium in England, sent by Pope Paschal II, rather than travelling to Rome to receive it. As archbishop, Ralph was very assertive of the rights of the see of Canterbury and of the liberties of the English church. He claimed authority in Wales and Scotland. Ralph also quarrelled for a time with Paschal.

Ralph suffered a stroke on 11 July 1119 and was left partially paralysed and unable to speak clearly from that time until his death on 20 October 1122. A surviving English translation of a sermon delivered by Ralph is preserved in a manuscript in the British Library. The sermon survives in some fifty Latin manuscripts.

== Early life ==
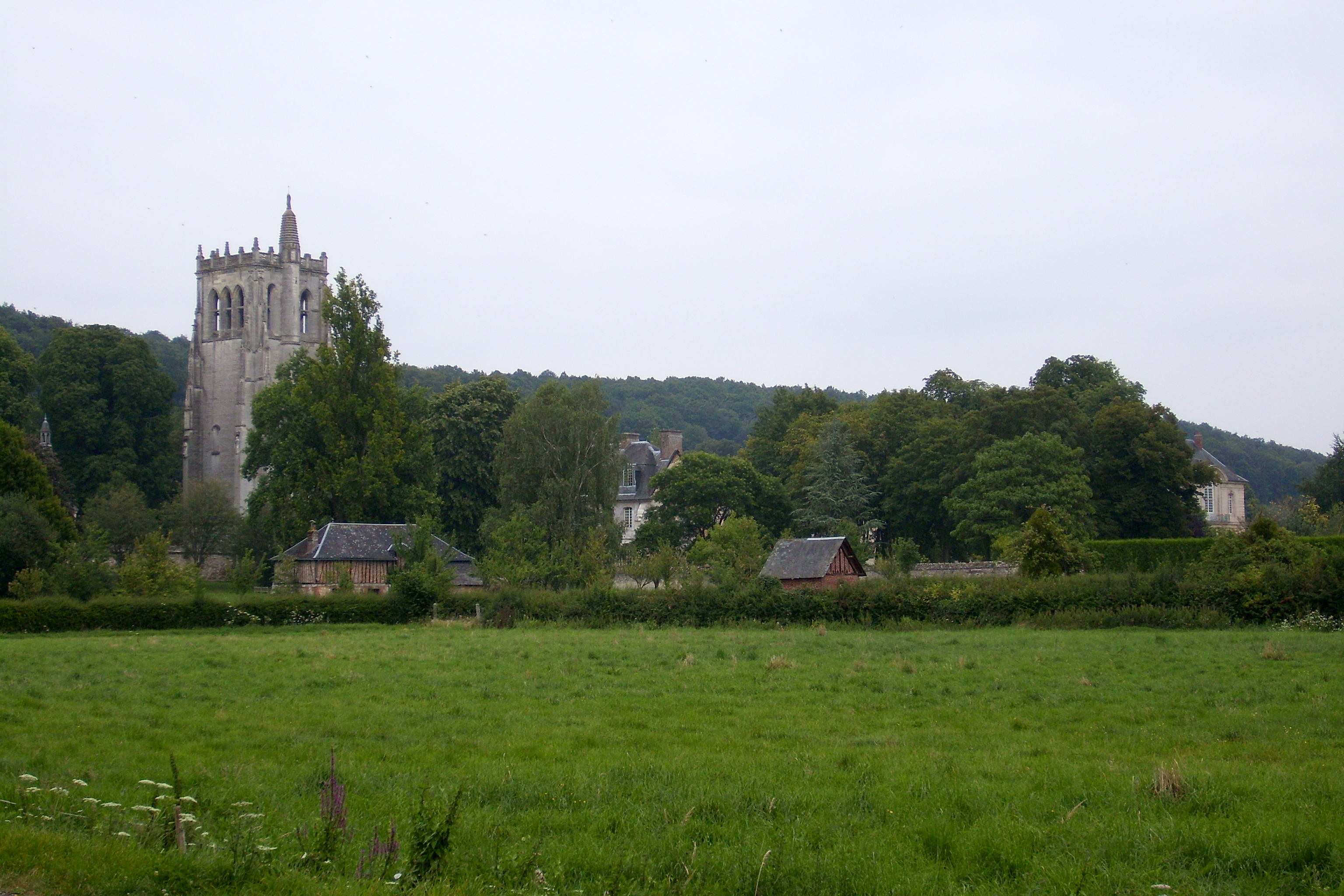
Abbey of Bec, where Ralph entered monastic life

Ralph was the son of Seffrid d'Escures and his first wife Rascendis, and a half brother of Seffrid I, Bishop of Chichester from 1125 to 1145. The surname of de Turbine, by which he is sometimes known in older scholarship, is only attested in the fourteenth century and possibly resulted from confusion with William de Corbeil, Ralph's successor at Canterbury. Ralph studied at the school at the Abbey of Bec before entering the abbey of St Martin at Séez in 1079. St. Martin was a house founded by the Montgomery and Bellême families, and was still under their lordship. He became abbot of the house in 1091, and his election was attended by Anselm, abbot of Bec.

== Time in England ==
Soon afterwards, Ralph paid a visit to England, perhaps to visit Shrewsbury Abbey, which was a daughter house of Séez. He may have been involved in mediating the surrender of Robert of Bellême at Shrewsbury in 1102, for some chroniclers state that it was Ralph who delivered the keys of the castle to King Henry I of England. In 1103, he took refuge in England from the demands of Robert of Bellême for homage. Ralph declined to do homage because Pope Urban II had ordered that no clergy could do homage to the laity. Robert was also demanding heavy taxes, and Ralph fled with Serlo, Bishop of Séez, who was also subjected to Robert's demands. He passed his time in England with his friends Saint Anselm and Gundulf the Bishop of Rochester. He attended the translation of Saint Cuthbert's remains at Durham, where he was one of examiners of the body, and declared the saint's remains uncorrupt. In 1106, he visited Anselm at the Abbey of Bec, but probably did not try to assert himself at Séez. After Anselm was elected to the see of Canterbury, Ralph appears to have become part of the archbishop's household.

In June 1108, Ralph succeeded Gundulf as Bishop of Rochester, having been nominated by Gundulf before his death. Ralph was consecrated on 9 August 1108. He was at Anselm's deathbed in April 1109, and, afterwards, Ralph acted as administrator of the see of Canterbury until 26 April 1114, when he was chosen Archbishop at Windsor. The king had wanted his doctor, Faricus, who was an Italian and Abbot of Abingdon, but the nobles and the bishops objected to anyone but a Norman being appointed. The bishops also desired someone who was not a monk, or at least not one who was so close to Henry. As a compromise, Ralph was chosen, rather than the secular clergy that the bishops favoured. Although Ralph was a monk and had not served as a royal clerk, he was also a bishop, which seems to have reconciled the other bishops to his selection.

== Archbishop of Canterbury ==
It is noteworthy that, while Ralph was not chosen by the chapter of Canterbury alone, his election involved an assembly of the magnates and bishops meeting with the king. He was not selected solely by the king, nor solely by the bishops or chapter. Ralph received his pallium from the pope, rather than travelling to Rome to retrieve it. However, it was only with difficulty that Pope Paschal II was persuaded to grant the pallium, as the papacy was attempting to reassert papal jurisdiction over the English Church. It was Anselm of St Saba who brought the pallium to England, along with letters from Paschal complaining that the English Church was translating bishops from see to see without papal permission, that legates from the papacy were being refused entry to England, and that the king was allowing no appeals to be made to the pope over ecclesiastical issues. In 1116, the pope even demanded the payment of Peter's Pence, a payment direct to the papacy of a penny from every household in England. Ralph, when he took the pallium, professed "fidelity and canonical obedience" to the pope, but did not submit to the papal demands and, in fact, supported King Henry in opposing the pope's demands.

As archbishop Ralph championed the rights of the see of Canterbury and the English church. He claimed authority in Wales and Scotland, writing to the pope that "the church of Canterbury has not ceased to provide pastoral care for the whole of Britain and Ireland, both as a benevolence and from its rights of primacy." He advised the bishop of Llandaff that a new Llandaff Cathedral should be built and granted an indulgence to contributors. He even refused to consecrate Thurstan as Archbishop of York because Thurstan would not profess obedience to the Archbishop of Canterbury, part of the Canterbury-York dispute. At first, Ralph depended only on the king to demand Thurstan to submit, but later he appealed to the popes to force Thurstan to obey. His refusal brought him into a dispute with the papacy, for Pope Paschal II supported Thurstan. Ralph visited Rome in 1117, but was unable to obtain an interview with Paschal as the pope had fled the city in front of an invading imperial army. Ralph had taken ill with an ulcer on his face during the trip to Rome and, for a time, it was feared that he would die. He recovered enough to continue to Rome; however, it was a fruitless trip. Despite instructions from Paschal's successors, Gelasius II and Calixtus II, the archbishop continued to refuse to consecrate Thurstan, and Thurstan was still unconsecrated when Ralph died. Thurstan was eventually consecrated at Rheims by Pope Calixtus II in May 1119, although the issue of primacy remained unresolved.

Although he feuded with York over the primacy, it appears clear that Ralph considered the Investiture Crisis settled in England for, in 1117, while visiting Rome, he took a neutral position as regards the issues between the Pope and the Emperor. In 1115, however, he refused to consecrate Bernard as Bishop of St David's in the royal chapel, although Robert of Meulan, the king's chief counsellor, advocated that the consecration must take place in the royal chapel according to ancient custom. The king did not insist, and Ralph won the confrontation. He was also involved in ecclesiastical affairs in Normandy, as he attended the provincial synod, or Council of Rouen, held in 1118.

== Final years and legacy ==
Ralph suffered a stroke on 11 July 1119, as he was removing his vestments after celebrating Mass. From then until his death, Ralph was partially paralysed and unable to speak clearly. He was still involved in decision making and, in 1120, he agreed to King Alexander I of Scotland's suggestion that Eadmer become the next Bishop of St Andrew's. Ralph was one of the lords consulted about the remarriage of Henry I to Adeliza of Leuven at London in 1121. He also successfully asserted his right to celebrate the king's new marriage, over attempts by Roger of Salisbury to officiate instead. Due to the damage from the stroke, Ralph was unable to perform the ceremony but, when Roger made an attempt to do so, Ralph successfully insisted on choosing the officiant and William Giffard the Bishop of Winchester performed the marriage. Ralph died on 20 October 1122, at Canterbury. He was buried in the nave of Canterbury Cathedral on 23 October 1122. His nephew, John, was a clerk under Ralph, and later Ralph appointed him Archdeacon of Canterbury. After Ralph's death, John was elected to the see of Rochester.

Ralph was regarded as a "witty, easygoing" man. The struggle with York, however, along with his illnesses and the effects of the stroke, turned Ralph in his last years into a quarrelsome person. Orderic Vitalis said that he was well educated and well loved by people. Even William of Malmesbury, no lover of ecclesiastics and always ready to find fault with them, could only find fault with him for his occasional lapses into unbecoming frivolity.

Ralph wrote a sermon for the feast of the Assumption of the Virgin, and it survives in some fifty Latin manuscripts, probably because it was thought to have been written by Anselm of Canterbury, until shown to be Ralph's in 1927. A surviving English translation of the sermon is also preserved in the manuscript British Library, Cotton Vespasian D. xiv. The Latin version, which Ralph was a translation of his originally spoken French version, has been edited and published in 1997. Ralph also had the monks of Christ Church, Canterbury, search for documents relating to the privileges of Canterbury and had those documents copied into a manuscript which still survives, BM MS Cotton Cleopatra E. His seal is one of the first to take the usual form for bishop's seals, with Ralph standing, in full vestments including a mitre, and performing a benediction with his right hand while holding his crosier in his left. The seal took the form of a pointed oval.

== Citations ==
Catholic Church titles
Preceded by Gundulf	Bishop of Rochester; 1108–1114	Succeeded by Ernulf
Preceded by Anselm of Canterbury	Archbishop of Canterbury; 1114–1122	Succeeded by William de Corbeil
