= John Bowle (bishop) =

English churchman and bishop of Rochester

- Bishop of Rochester
- Church: Church of England
- Diocese: Diocese of Rochester
- Elected: 14 December 1629
- Term ended: 1637 (death)
- Predecessor: Walter Curle
- Successor: John Warner
- Other posts: Dean of Salisbury; 1620–1629

Orders
- Consecration: c. 1630

Personal details
- Died: 9 October 1637
- Buried: St. Paul's Cathedral
- Denomination: Anglican
- Education: Trinity College, Cambridge

John Bowle (died 9 October 1637) was an English churchman and bishop of Rochester.

A native of Lancashire, he was educated at Trinity College, Cambridge, where he obtained a fellowship. He proceeded M.A. (1603), D.D. (1613), and was incorporated M.A. of Oxford on 9 July 1605, and D.D. on 11 July 1615. He was household chaplain to Robert Cecil, 1st Earl of Salisbury, and attended him through his last illness in 1612.

Bowle held at one time the living of both Bradfield and Tilehurst in Berkshire. He became dean of Salisbury in July 1620, preached before the king and parliament on 3 February 1621, and was elected bishop of Rochester on 14 December 1629. He died on 9 October 1637, and his body was interred in St. Paul's Cathedral. Archbishop William Laud, in his account of his archiepiscopate addressed to Charles I for 1637, complained that Bowle had been ill for three years before his death, and had neglected his diocese.

== Works ==
He was the author of a Sermon preached at Flitton in the countie of Bedford at the funerall of Henrie [Grey], Earle of Kent, London, 1614, and of a Concio ad ... Patres et Presbyteros totius Provinciæ Cantuar. in Synodo Londini congregates, habita . . . 1620, Jan. 31, London, 1621.

== Family ==
Bowle married Bridget, a sister of Sir George Copping, 'of the crown office,' by whom he had a son (Richard) and a daughter (Mary).

Church of England titles
| Preceded by Walter Curle | Bishop of Rochester; 1630–1637 | Succeeded by John Warner |
