= Edmund de Bromfield =

English bishop of Llandaff (died 1393)

Edmund de Bromfield (Edmund Bromfeld or Bramfield; died 1393) was an English Benedictine who became bishop of Llandaff.

== Life ==
He was a monk of the Benedictine Bury St Edmunds Abbey. Unpopular in the abbey, Bromfield was sent to Rome as public procurator for the whole Benedictine order, a promise being at the same time asked from him that he would seek no preferment in his own community. A reputation for learning followed him to Rome, where he was appointed to lecture on divinity.

On the death of the abbot of Bury St Edmunds he sought and obtained the appointment from the pope, in spite of his oath. The monks, however, with the sanction of King Richard II, chose John Timworth for abbot, and on Bromfield's arrival in England to claim his appointment he was seized and imprisoned on a charge of violating the statute of Provisors, a precursor of the statute of Præmunire. The pope did not interfere, but after an imprisonment of nearly ten years Bromfield was released, and, with the king's concurrence, appointed bishop of Llandaff in 1389 on the translation of William Bottesham to the see of Rochester. In the royal brief confirming to him the temporalities of the see Bromfield is designated abbot of the Benedictine monastery of Silva Major (Grande-Sauve Abbey) in the diocese of Bordeaux, and 'Scholarum Palatii Apostolici in sacra theologia magister.'

Bromfield died in 1393, and was buried in Llandaff Cathedral.
