= Arnost =

11th-century Bishop of Rochester

- Bishop of Rochester
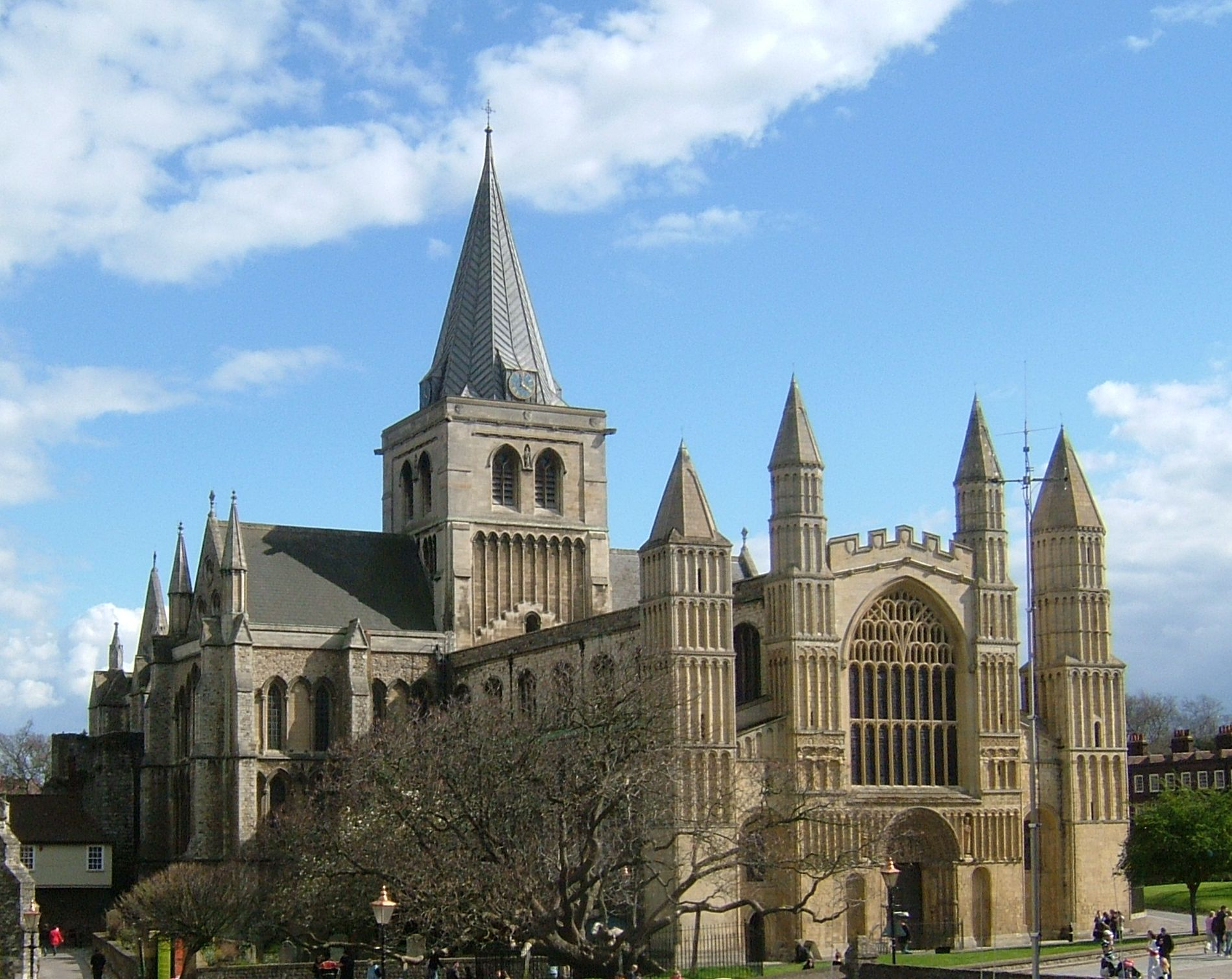
- Rochester Cathedral
- Elected: c. 1076
- Term ended: 15 July 1076
- Predecessor: Siward
- Successor: Gundulf
- Other post: monk at Bec Abbey

Orders
- Consecration: early 1076

Personal details
- Died: 15 July 1076
- Denomination: Catholic

Arnost was a medieval Bishop of Rochester.

Arnost was a monk at Bec Abbey in Normandy France before being selected for the see of Rochester. He was consecrated early 1076. He died about 15 July 1076.

== Citations ==
Catholic Church titles
Preceded by Siward	Bishop of Rochester; 1076	Succeeded by Gundulf
