= Aldwulf of Rochester =

8th-century Bishop of Rochester

Aldwulf
- Bishop of Rochester
- Appointed: likely 727
- Term ended: 739
- Predecessor: Tobias
- Successor: Dunn

Orders
- Consecration: likely 727

Personal details
- Died: 739
- Denomination: Christian

Aldwulf or Ealdwulf (died 739) was a medieval Bishop of Rochester. He was probably consecrated in 727 and died in 739. According to Bede (Historia ecclesiastica 5.23) his consecrator was Archbishop Berctwald.

== Citations ==
Christian titles
Preceded by Tobias	Bishop of Rochester likely 727–739	Succeeded by Dunn
