= Richard Neile =

Archbishop of York from 1631 to 1640

The Most Reverend and Right Honourable Richard Neile
- Archbishop of York
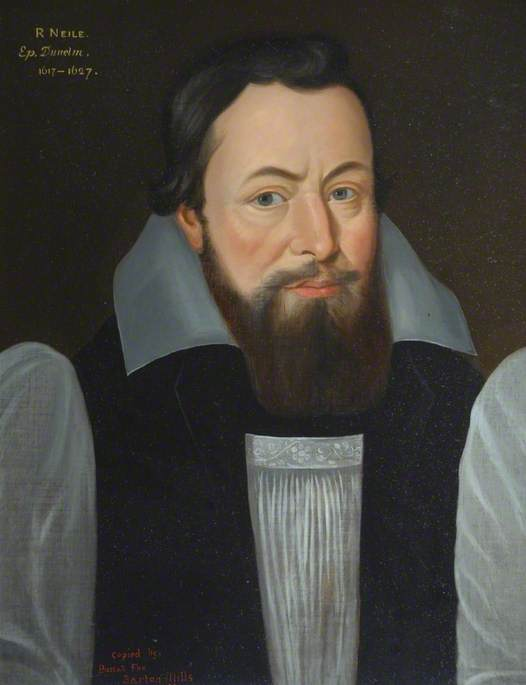
- Installed: 1631
- Term ended: 1640
- Predecessor: Samuel Harsnett
- Successor: John Williams

Personal details
- Born: baptised 11 March 1562
- Died: 31 October 1640 (aged 78)
- Denomination: Church of England
- Education: Westminster School
- Alma mater: St John's College, Cambridge

Richard Neile (or Neale; 1562 – 31 October 1640) was an English churchman, bishop successively of six English dioceses, more than any other man, including the Archdiocese of York from 1631 until his death.

== Early life ==
Neile was born in Westminster, and baptised on 11 March 1562 at St Margaret's, Westminster.

He was son of a tallow-chandler, though his grandfather had been a courtier and official under Henry VIII, until he was deprived for non-compliance with the Six Articles. He was educated at Westminster School, under Edward Grant and William Camden. He was sent by Mildred, Lady Burghley (wife of William Cecil, 1st Baron Burghley), on the recommendation of Gabriel Goodman to St John's College, Cambridge as a pensioner, matriculating at Easter 1580, graduating B.A. 1584, M.A. 1587, B.D. 1595, D.D. 1600.

Ordained deacon and priest at Peterborough in 1589, he continued to enjoy the patronage of the Burghley family, residing in their household, and became chaplain to Lord Burghley, and later to his son Robert Cecil, 1st Earl of Salisbury.

He preached before Queen Elizabeth, and became vicar of Cheshunt, Hertfordshire (1590) and rector of Toddington, Bedfordshire (1598). He was appointed Master of the Savoy in 1602, and in July 1603 Clerk of the Closet, a position he would hold until 1632. On 5 November 1605 he was installed Dean of Westminster, resigning the deanery in 1610.

== Bishop ==
He held successively the bishoprics of Rochester (1608), Lichfield and Coventry (1610), Lincoln (1614), Durham (1617), and Winchester (1628), and the archbishopric of York (1631).

While at Rochester he appointed William Laud as his chaplain and gave him several valuable preferments. In 1612, King James appointed Neile to manage the transport of the body of Mary, Queen of Scots, from Peterborough Cathedral to Westminster Abbey.

His political activity while bishop of Durham was rewarded with a privy councillorship in 1627. Neile sat regularly in the courts of Star Chamber and High Commission. His correspondence with Laud and with Sir Dudley Carleton and Sir Francis Windebank (Charles I's secretaries of state) are valuable sources for the history of the time. He was involved in the last burning at the stake for heresy in England, that of the Arian Edward Wightman in 1612.

Oliver Cromwell made only one speech during his first stint as a Member of Parliament for Huntingdon in the Parliament of 1628–1629, a poorly received attack against Neile, possibly over disagreement with his form of Arminianism.

== Family ==
Neile was the father of Sir Paul Neile, astronomer and politician, and grandfather of William Neile, mathematician. His brother, another William Neile (1560–1624), was a book-collector who left 880 books to his children at his death.

Church of England titles
Preceded by Lancelot Andrewes	Dean of Westminster; 1605–1610	Succeeded by George Montaigne
Preceded by William Barlow	Bishop of Rochester; 1608–1610	Succeeded by John Buckeridge
Preceded by George Abbot	Bishop of Lichfield; 1610–1614	Succeeded by John Overal
Preceded by William Barlow	Bishop of Lincoln; 1614–1617	Succeeded by George Montaigne
Preceded by William James	Bishop of Durham; 1617–1628	Succeeded by George Montaigne
Preceded by Lancelot Andrewes	Bishop of Winchester; 1628–1631	Succeeded by Walter Curle
Preceded by Samuel Harsnett	Archbishop of York; 1631–1640	Succeeded by John Williams
Political offices
Preceded by The Earl of Somerset	Lord Lieutenant of Durham; 1617–1627	Vacant Title next held by John Howson
