= John Bottlesham =

15th-century Bishop of Rochester

- Bishop of Rochester
- Appointed: 9 April 1400
- Term ended: 17 April 1404
- Predecessor: William Bottlesham
- Successor: Richard Young

Orders
- Consecration: 4 July 1400

Personal details
- Died: 17 April 1404
- Denomination: Catholic

John Bottlesham was a medieval Bishop of Rochester.

Prior to Bottlesham's appointment as bishop, he was Master of Peterhouse, Cambridge, beginning his term on 27 August 1397 and resigning in 1400. He was nominated as bishop on 9 April 1400 and consecrated on 4 July 1400. He died on 17 April 1404.

== Citations ==
Catholic Church titles
Preceded by William Bottlesham	Bishop of Rochester; 1400–1404	Succeeded by Richard Young
Academic offices
Preceded by William Cavendish	Master of Peterhouse, Cambridge; 1397–1400	Succeeded by Thomas de Castro-Bernardi
