= Tobias (bishop of Rochester) =

7th and 8th-century Bishop of Rochester

- Bishop of Rochester
- Appointed: between 699 and 716
- Term ended: 726
- Predecessor: Gebmund
- Successor: Aldwulf

Orders
- Consecration: between 699 and 716

Personal details
- Died: 726
- Denomination: Christian

Tobias was a medieval Bishop of Rochester. He was consecrated between 699 and 716. He died in 726. According to Bede (5.23), he was as skilled in Latin and Greek as in his native language, and highly learned in sacred and secular literature. His teachers were archbishop Theodoric and abbot Hadrian. Bede reports that he was buried in the 'portico' (in porticu) of St Paul the Apostle, a space he had created for his own burial within the church of St Andrew (i.e. the cathedral of Rochester).

== Citations ==
Christian titles
Preceded by Gebmund	Bishop of Rochester c. 699–726	Succeeded by Aldwulf
