= Dunn (bishop) =

8th-century Bishop of Rochester

- Bishop of Rochester
- Appointed: c. 740
- Term ended: 747
- Predecessor: Ealdwulf
- Successor: Eardwulf

Orders
- Consecration: c. 740

Personal details
- Died: 747
- Denomination: Christian

Dunn was a medieval Bishop of Rochester. He was consecrated probably around 740. He died in 747.

== Citations ==
Christian titles
Preceded by Ealdwulf	Bishop of Rochester c. 740–747	Succeeded by Eardwulf
