= Gebmund =

7th-century Bishop of Rochester

- Bishop of Rochester
- Appointed: c. 678
- Term ended: between 699 and 716
- Predecessor: Cwichhelm
- Successor: Tobias

Orders
- Consecration: c. 678

Personal details
- Died: between 699 and 716
- Denomination: Christian

Gebmund was a medieval Bishop of Rochester. He was consecrated about 678. He died between 699 and 716.

== Citations ==
Christian titles
Preceded by Cwichhelm	Bishop of Rochester c. 678–693	Succeeded by Tobias
