= Ceolmund (bishop of Rochester) =

9th and 10th-century Bishop of Rochester

- Bishop of Rochester
- Appointed: between 893 and 900
- Term ended: between 909 and 926
- Predecessor: Swithwulf
- Successor: Cyneferth

Orders
- Consecration: between 893 and 900

Personal details
- Died: between 909 and 926
- Denomination: Christian

Ceolmund was a medieval Bishop of Rochester. He was consecrated between 893 and 900. He died between 909 and 926.

== Citations ==
Christian titles
Preceded by Swithwulf	Bishop of Rochester c. 896–c. 917	Succeeded by Cyneferth
