= Eardwulf of Rochester =

8th-century Bishop of Rochester

Eardwulf
- Bishop of Rochester
- Appointed: 747
- Term ended: between 765 and 772
- Predecessor: Dunn
- Successor: Diora

Orders
- Consecration: 747

Personal details
- Died: between 765 and 772
- Denomination: Christian

Eardwulf was a medieval Bishop of Rochester.

Eardwulf was consecrated in 747. He died between 765 and 772. Between 759 and 765, King Sigeread of Kent granted land to Eardwulf and his clergy.

== Citations ==
Christian titles
| Preceded by Dunn | Bishop of Rochester; 747–c. 768 | Succeeded by Diora |
