= John I (bishop of Rochester) =

12th-century Bishop of Rochester

John
- Bishop of Rochester
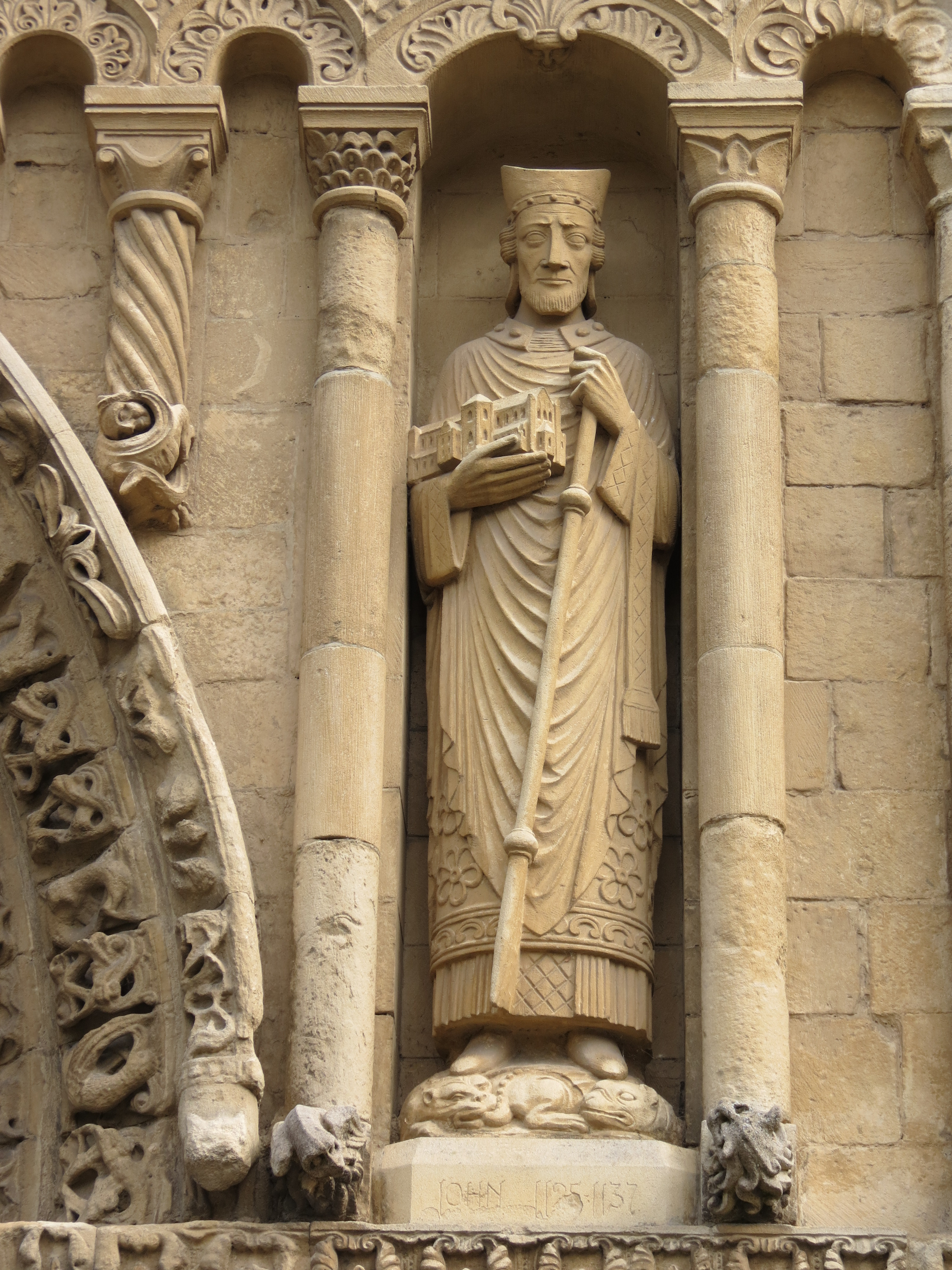
- Elected: before 12 April 1125
- Term ended: 20 June 1137
- Predecessor: Ernulf
- Successor: John II
- Other posts: Archdeacon of Canterbury

Orders
- Consecration: 24 May 1125

Personal details
- Died: 20 June 1137
- Denomination: Catholic

John was a medieval Bishop of Rochester.

== Life ==
John was a nephew of Ralph d'Escures Archbishop of Canterbury, who he served as a clerk. He was appointed Archdeacon of Canterbury between 27 June 1115 and 16 September 1115.

John was elected to the See of Rochester before 12 April 1125 and consecrated on 24 May 1125. He died on 20 June 1137.

== Citations ==
Catholic Church titles
Preceded by Ernulf	Bishop of Rochester; 1125–1137	Succeeded by John II
