= Waermund II (bishop of Rochester) =

9th-century Bishop of Rochester

Waermund
- Bishop of Rochester
- Appointed: between 845 and 868
- Term ended: between 845 and 868
- Predecessor: Badenoth
- Successor: Cuthwulf

Orders
- Consecration: between 845 and 868

Personal details
- Died: between 845 and 868
- Denomination: Christian

Waermund (or Wærmund) was a medieval Bishop of Rochester. He was consecrated between 845 and 868. He died between 845 and 868.

== Citations ==
Christian titles
| Preceded by Badenoth | Bishop of Rochester mid 9th-century | Succeeded by Cuthwulf |
