= Cuthwulf (bishop of Rochester) =

9th-century Bishop of Rochester

- Bishop of Rochester
- Appointed: between 845 and 868
- Term ended: between 868 and 880
- Predecessor: Waermund II
- Successor: Swithwulf

Orders
- Consecration: between 845 and 868

Personal details
- Died: between 868 and 880
- Denomination: Christian

Cuthwulf was a medieval Bishop of Rochester. He was consecrated between 845 and 868. He died between 868 and 880.

== Citations ==
Christian titles
| Preceded by Waermund II | Bishop of Rochester c. 865–c. 874 | Succeeded by Swithwulf |
