= Burgric =

10th-century Bishop of Rochester

- Bishop of Rochester
- Appointed: between January 933 and May 934
- Term ended: between 946 and 964
- Predecessor: Cyneferth
- Successor: Beorhtsige

Orders
- Consecration: between January 933 and May 934

Personal details
- Died: between 946 and 964
- Denomination: Christian

Burgric (or Burhric) was a medieval Bishop of Rochester. He was consecrated between January 933 and May 934. He died between 946 and 964.

== Citations ==
Christian titles
Preceded by Cyneferth	Bishop of Rochester c. 933–c. 955	Succeeded by Beorhtsige
