= Godwine I (bishop of Rochester) =

10th and 11th-century Bishop of Rochester

- Bishop of Rochester
- Appointed: c. 995
- Term ended: c.1013
- Predecessor: Ælfstan
- Successor: Godwine II

Orders
- Consecration: between 994 and 995

Personal details
- Died: c. 1013
- Denomination: Christian

Godwine was a medieval Bishop of Rochester. He was consecrated between 994 and 995. He died sometime around 1013.

== Citations ==
Christian titles
Preceded by Ælfstan	Bishop of Rochester c. 995–c. 1013	Succeeded by Godwine II
