= Diora =

8th-century Bishop of Rochester

- Bishop of Rochester
- Appointed: between 765 and 772
- Term ended: between 781 and 785
- Predecessor: Eardwulf
- Successor: Waermund I

Orders
- Consecration: between 765 and 772

Personal details
- Died: between 781 and 785
- Denomination: Christian

Diora (or Deora) was a medieval Bishop of Rochester.

Diora was consecrated between 765 and 772. He died between 781 and 785. Around 779 or so King Ethelbert granted land inside the city of Rochester to Diora and his cathedral clergy.

== Citations ==
Christian titles
Preceded by Eardwulf	Bishop of Rochester c. 768–c. 783	Succeeded by Waermund I
