= Badenoth =

9th-century Bishop of Rochester

- Bishop of Rochester
- Appointed: between 845 and 868
- Term ended: between 845 and 868
- Predecessor: Tatnoth
- Successor: Waermund II

Orders
- Consecration: between 845 and 868

Personal details
- Died: between 845 and 868
- Denomination: Christian

Badenoth (or Badunoth) was a medieval Bishop of Rochester. He was consecrated between 845 and 868 and died between 845 and 868.

== Citations ==
Christian titles
Preceded by Tatnoth	Bishop of Rochester mid 9th-century	Succeeded by Waermund II
