= William Bottlesham =

14th-century Bishop of Rochester and Bishop of Llandaff

- Bishop of Rochester
- Appointed: 27 August 1389
- Term ended: February 1400
- Predecessor: Thomas Brinton
- Successor: John Bottlesham
- Previous post: Bishop of Llandaff

Personal details
- Died: February 1400
- Denomination: Catholic

William Bottlesham was a medieval Bishop of Llandaff and Bishop of Rochester.

Bottlesham was made first titular Bishop of Bethlehem in 1385 and was translated from Bethlehem to Llandaff in 1386. He was then translated from Llandaff to Rochester on 27 August 1389.

Bottlesham died about 26 February 1400.

== Citations ==
Catholic Church titles
Preceded by Thomas Rushook	Bishop of Llandaff; 1386–1389	Succeeded by Edmund Bromfeld
Preceded by Thomas Brinton	Bishop of Rochester; 1389–1400	Succeeded by John Bottlesham
