= John Young (bishop of Rochester) =

English academic and bishop

- Bishop of Rochester
- Church: Church of England
- Diocese: Rochester
- Elected: 1578
- Term ended: 1605 (death)
- Predecessor: John Piers
- Successor: William Barlow
- Other posts: Master of Pembroke College, Cambridge (1567–1578)

Personal details
- Born: c. 1532
- Died: 1605
- Denomination: Anglican
- Profession: Academic
- Education: University of Cambridge

John Young (c. 1532 – 1605) was an English academic and bishop.

== Early life ==
He was educated at Mercers' School in London, and graduated BA at the University of Cambridge in 1552. He became a Fellow of Pembroke Hall, Cambridge in 1553, and Master there in 1567. He was Vice-Chancellor of the University of Cambridge in 1569.

== Career ==
He became Bishop of Rochester in 1578, employing Edmund Spenser as secretary for a short time early in his tenure. In The Shepheardes Calender Young appears as Roffy, which abbreviates Roffensis, alluding to his see.

== Notes ==
Academic offices
Preceded by John Whitgift	Master of Pembroke College, Cambridge; 1567–1578	Succeeded by William Fulke
Church of England titles
Preceded by John Piers	Bishop of Rochester; 1578–1605	Succeeded by William Barlow
