= Waermund I (bishop of Rochester) =

8th and 9th-century Bishop of Rochester

- Bishop of Rochester
- Appointed: between 781 and 783
- Term ended: between October 803 and 804
- Predecessor: Diora
- Successor: Beornmod

Orders
- Consecration: between 781 and 783

Personal details
- Died: between October 803 and 804
- Denomination: Christian

Waermund (or Wærmund) was a medieval Bishop of Rochester.

Waermund was consecrated between 781 and 783. He died between October 803 and 804. In 789, the bishop was granted two properties in Kent by King Offa of Mercia.

== Citations ==
Christian titles
| Preceded by Diora | Bishop of Rochester c. 783–c. 804 | Succeeded by Beornmod |
