= Tatnoth =

9th-century Bishop of Rochester

- Bishop of Rochester
- Elected: 844
- Term ended: between 845 and 868
- Predecessor: Beornmod
- Successor: Badenoth

Personal details
- Died: between 845 and 862
- Denomination: Christian

Tatnoth was a medieval Bishop of Rochester. He was elected in 844. He died between 845 and 868.

== Citations ==
Christian titles
Preceded by Beornmod	Bishop of Rochester; 844–c. 853	Succeeded by Badenoth
