= Swithwulf (bishop of Rochester) =

9th-century Bishop of Rochester

- Bishop of Rochester
- Appointed: between 868 and 880
- Term ended: between 893 and 896
- Predecessor: Cuthwulf
- Successor: Ceolmund

Orders
- Consecration: between 868 and 880

Personal details
- Died: between 893 and 896
- Denomination: Christian

Swithwulf was a medieval Bishop of Rochester. He was consecrated between 868 and 880. He died between 893 and 896.

== Citations ==
Christian titles
Preceded by Cuthwulf	Bishop of Rochester c. 874–c. 895	Succeeded by Ceolmund
