= Beorhtsige =

10th-century Bishop of Rochester

- Bishop of Rochester
- Appointed: between 946 and 949
- Term ended: between 955 and 964
- Predecessor: Burgric
- Successor: Ælfstan

Orders
- Consecration: between 946 and 949

Personal details
- Died: between 955 and 964
- Denomination: Christian

Beorhtsige was a medieval Bishop of Rochester.

There is some uncertainty about Beorhtsige's existence, but he possibly was consecrated between 946 and 949. He died between 955 and 964.

== Citations ==
Christian titles
| Preceded by Burgric | Bishop of Rochester c. 947–c. 949 | Succeeded by Ælfstan |
