= Thomas Trilleck =

14th-century Bishop of Rochester

- Bishop of Rochester
- Appointed: 6 March 1364
- Term ended: December 1372
- Predecessor: William Whittlesey
- Successor: Thomas Brinton

Orders
- Consecration: 26 May 1364

Personal details
- Died: December 1372
- Denomination: Catholic

Thomas Trilleck (died December 1372) was a medieval Bishop of Rochester.

Trilleck was the nephew of Adam Orleton, Bishop of Hereford and younger brother of John Trilleck, also a Bishop of Hereford. The Trilleck family originated in the village of Trelleck, near Monmouth.

Trilleck was appointed Dean of Hereford in 1352 until 1361, and then served as Dean of St Paul's from 1362 to 1364.

Trilleck was nominated as Bishop of Rochester on 6 March 1364 and consecrated on 26 May 1364. He died between 12 December and 25 December 1372.

== Citations ==
Catholic Church titles
Preceded by William Whittlesey	Bishop of Rochester; 1364–1372	Succeeded by Thomas Brinton
