= Gilbert Glanvill =

12th and 13th-century Bishop of Rochester

- Bishop of Rochester
- Elected: 16 July 1185
- Term ended: 24 June 1214
- Predecessor: Waleran
- Successor: Benedict of Sausetun
- Other post: Archdeacon of Lisieux

Orders
- Ordination: 21 September 1185
- Consecration: 29 September 1185

Personal details
- Died: 24 June 1214
- Denomination: Catholic

Gilbert Glanvill or Gilbert de Glanville was a medieval Bishop of Rochester.

== Life ==
Glanvill was a clerk of Archbishop Baldwin of Canterbury and the archdeacon of the Lisieux. He was elected bishop of Rochester on 16 July 1185. He was ordained as a priest on 21 September and consecrated 29 September of the same year.

In 1190, early during the reign of Richard I, he founded a hospital in Strood, east of the church, which was afterwards called the Newark or Stroud Hospital. In 1539, under King Henry VIII, the hospital was put under the control of the Dean and Chapter of Rochester.

In 1201, 5 acres of King John's demesne wood in Ospringe were given to him. He was forced to flee England with Bishop Herbert of Salisbury in 1207 during the dispute between King John and Pope Innocent III over the election of the new archbishop of Canterbury.

Glanvill died on 24 June 1214.

== Citations ==
Catholic Church titles
Preceded by Waleran	Bishop of Rochester; 1185–1214	Succeeded by Benedict of Sausetun
