= Cwichhelm (bishop) =

7th-century Bishop of Rochester

- Bishop of Rochester
- Appointed: c. 676
- Term ended: 678 (resigned)
- Predecessor: Putta
- Successor: Gebmund

Orders
- Consecration: c. 676

Personal details
- Died: after 678
- Denomination: Christian

Cwichhelm or Cwichelm was a medieval Bishop of Rochester.

Cwichhelm was consecrated probably around 676. He resigned the see in 678, and his date of death is unknown.

== Citations ==
Christian titles
Preceded by Putta	Bishop of Rochester c. 676–678	Succeeded by Gebmund
