= John Warner (bishop) =

English churchman, Bishop of Rochester and royalist

The Right Reverend John Warner
- Bishop of Rochester
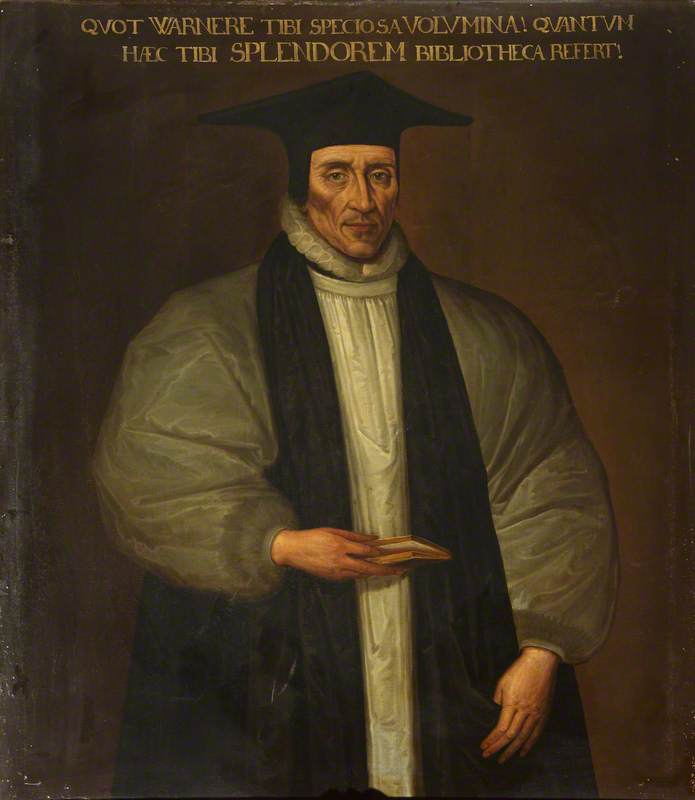
- Church: Church of England
- Diocese: Diocese of Rochester
- Elected: 1637
- Term ended: 1646–1660 (abolished); 1666 (death)
- Predecessor: John Bowle
- Successor: John Dolben

Orders
- Consecration: 14 January 1638 by William Laud

Personal details
- Born: 1581 London
- Died: 14 October 1666
- Buried: Merton's Chapel, Rochester Cathedral
- Denomination: Anglican
- Parents: Harman Warner of London
- Spouse: 1 wife
- Education: Magdalen College, Oxford

John Warner (1581 – 14 October 1666) was an English churchman, Bishop of Rochester and royalist.

== Life and career ==
Son of Harman Warner of London, merchant tailor, he was baptised at St. Clement Danes in the Strand on 17 September 1581. He became demy of Magdalen College, Oxford, in 1599, and was elected fellow there in 1604. He proceeded M.A. in 1605, and D.D. in 1616. He was rector of St. Michael's, Crooked Lane, London, from 1614 to 1619, and was nominated prebendary and canon of Canterbury in 1616. He was instituted rector of Bishopsbourne, Kent, in 1619, rector of Hollingbourne, Kent, in 1624, and rector of St. Dionis Backchurch, London, in 1625.

Warner was a strong supporter of the monarchy. In 1626, he preached in Passion week before the king at Whitehall a sermon on Matthew xxi. 38: 'This is the heir; come, let us kill him,' which nearly occasioned his impeachment by parliament, and induced him to obtain for safety the king's pardon. In 1633 he became chaplain to Charles I and dean of Lichfield. In the same year he attended the king at his coronation in Edinburgh. In 1637, he was promoted to the bishopric of Rochester. He was elected to the See on 13 November 1637, confirmed 11 January 1638, and consecrated a bishop on 14 January. In March 1640, he preached a sermon in Rochester Cathedral on Psalm liiiv. 23, 'Forget not the voice of thy enemies,' against the puritans and rebels, to which allusion made in 'Scot Scout's Discovery.'

Warner attended at York in 1640 the king's council of peers, at which only one other prelate was present. He took part in the convocation which was called together on the opening of the Short Parliament of 1640. When that parliament was dissolved, and the convocation continued its sittings under royal licence, Warner assisted William Laud in framing new canons. Warner joined in the declaration made on 14 May 1641 by the bishops to maintain the existing constitution of church and state. On 4 August following he was impeached with other bishops by the House of Commons, under the stature of praemunire, for taking part in the convocation of 1640 and making new canons. In December 1641 Warner, with eleven other bishops, was committed to prison, but the impeachment was afterwards dropped, meeting the defence made by Warner through Chaloner Chute, the counsel whom he had selected for the defence of the bishops. On 13 February 1642, when the bishops were excluded by statute from the House of Lords. Sequestration of his lands and goods followed in 1643, and Warner had to leave Bromley Palace in disguise. For three years he led a wandering life in the west of England. He was deprived of his See by Parliament on 9 October 1646, as episcopacy was abolished for the duration of the Commonwealth and the Protectorate.

By Charles's command he published in 1646 a treatise on Church Lands not to be sold, or a Necessary and Plain Answer to the question of a Conscientious Protestant whether the lands of Bishops and Churches in England and Wales may be sold. On 4 February 1649, within a week of the execution of Charles I, he preached and afterwards published anonymously a sermon alluding to it on Luke xviii. 31: 'Behold we go up to Jerusalem', entitled The Devilish Conspiracy.

In 1649, on payment of a fine, the sequestrations on his property were discharged; but he refused to take the oaths to the usurping government, as he considered it to be. At the Restoration Warner and eight other sequestrated bishops who had survived resumed, the government of their dioceses. In 1661 parliament recalled the bishops to the House of Lords, and once more, on 11 February 1662, Warner was able to address his clergy in Rochester Cathedral. He died on 14 October 1666, aged 86, and was buried in Merton's Chapel in Rochester Cathedral, where a monument by Joshua Marshall exists to his memory.

== Legacy ==
Warner was married, but he died without issue, and on his death his estates descended to his nephew John Lee, archdeacon of Rochester, who was the son of his sister, and who afterwards assumed the additional name of Warner in compliance with the terms of the bishop's will. Warner had inherited wealth, and endowed Bromley College (or Bishop Warner's College at Bromley), a home for 20 widows of clergyman, to be supported by his estate at Swaton, among numerous gifts and benefactions. Money he left for Scottish scholarships at Magdalen College, was refused, and Balliol College took it, urged by Thomas Good.

Gilbert Burnet had a copy of the Articles of the Barons, the heads of agreement for the Magna Carta, and he said it had come via John Lee from Warner, who had taken it from Lambeth Palace at the time of Laud's arrest on 18 December 1640. Hugh Trevor-Roper finds this episode, in which Warner took papers of Laud's for safe-keeping or to avoid embarrassment, to be confused in its details when Burnet's account is compared with Laud's. But he doesn't rule out Burnet's version. Stephen Langton took the Articles in 1215, and they were in the Lambeth archives.

== Works ==
Warner published sermons, and contributed to Matthew Poole's Synopsis Criticorum. In 1645 he published The Gayne of Losse, or Temporal Losses spiritually improved, in a Century and one Decad of Meditations and Resolves. The authorship of an anonymous manuscript diary giving eyewitness details of the House of Lords during the start of the Long parliament is attributed to him, for example by Conrad Russell.

== Notes ==
Church of England titles
Preceded by Augustine Lindsell	Dean of Lichfield; 1633–1638	Succeeded by Samuel Fell
Preceded by John Bowle	Bishop of Rochester; 1638–1646 & 1660–1666	Succeeded by John Dolben
