= Walter (bishop of Rochester) =

12th-century Bishop of Rochester

- Bishop of Rochester
- Elected: 27 January 1148
- Term ended: 26 July 1182
- Predecessor: Ascelin
- Successor: Waleran
- Other posts: Archdeacon of Canterbury

Orders
- Consecration: 14 March 1148

Personal details
- Died: 26 July 1182
- Denomination: Catholic

Walter was a medieval Bishop of Rochester.

Walter was the brother of Theobald of Bec, who was Archbishop of Canterbury from 1139 to 1161. Theobald selected Walter to be Archdeacon of Canterbury soon after Theobald's election, and it was Theobald who secured Walter's election to Rochester.

Walter was elected on 27 January 1148 and consecrated on 14 March 1148. He died on 26 July 1182.

== Citations ==
Catholic Church titles
Preceded by Ascelin	Bishop of Rochester; 1148–1182	Succeeded by Waleran
