= Beornmod =

9th-century Bishop of Rochester

- Bishop of Rochester
- Appointed: 804
- Term ended: between 842 and 844
- Predecessor: Waermund I
- Successor: Tatnoth

Orders
- Consecration: 804

Personal details
- Died: between 842 and 844
- Denomination: Christian

Beornmod was a medieval Bishop of Rochester. He was consecrated in 804. He died between 842 and 844.

== Citations ==
Christian titles
Preceded by Waermund I	Bishop of Rochester; 804–c. 843	Succeeded by Tatnoth
