= Roger Fenton (priest) =

English clergyman (1565–1615)

Roger Fenton (1565 – 16 January 1615) was an English clergyman, one of the translators of the Authorised King James Version of the Bible.

== Life ==
=== Education and clerical career ===
He was born in Lancashire and was educated at Pembroke Hall, Cambridge, where he matriculated as a sizar in 1585. He graduated B.A. in 1589, becoming a fellow in 1590. He graduated M.A. in 1592; he later proceeded B.D. in 1602 and D.D. in 1613 From 1598 he was preacher to the readers at Gray's Inn, and held the post till his death.

In 1601 he was made rector of St. Stephen's, Walbrook, and in 1603 of the neighbouring St. Benet's Sherehog. He resigned the latter in 1606, on his appointment to the vicarage of Chigwell, Essex. In 1609 he succeeded Lancelot Andrewes in the prebend of St. Pancras in St. Paul's, which made him rector and patron, as well as vicar, of Chigwell.

=== Translation work ===
Fenton was one of the Second Westminster Company of translators of the King James Bible, dealing with the Epistles of the New Testament. He worked on this with William Barlow.

== Death and legacy ==
He died 16 January 1615, and was buried under the communion-table of St Stephen’s Church; Nicholas Felton preached at his funeral.

One of his descendants, also called Roger Fenton, was the first war photographer, working during the Crimean War.

His sermons are held at Cambridge University Library.

== Works ==
Fenton's first work, An Answer to William Alablaster his Motives, was published in 1599, noting that William Alabaster was then a prisoner in the Tower of London.

He published A Perfume Against Naysome Pestilence in 1603 and a sermon collection entitled A Sermon Preached at St. Mary Spittle in 1606.

In 1611 Fenton published A Treatise of Usurie, in three books; there was a second edition in 1612. In 1652 there appeared a tract by Robert Filmer The author states in his preface that George Downame, Fenton and Andrewes are the noted opponents of usury, in England, but (he continues) 'I have made choice of Dr. Fenton's treatise to examine because it is latest, and I find little of any moment but is in him.' A note by Roger Twysden in Filmer's book suggests it was written three decades before publication.

A manuscript in the Cambridge University Library (MS Ff. 5. 25, fos. 17r–22r) contains a contemporary copy of a brief treatise by Fenton, entitled 'De Æquivocatione' (On Equivocation). It is dedicated to Sir Francis Bacon in his capacity as Solicitor-General, and must therefore date from between 1607 and 1613. Like the English treatise Of Usurie this Latin document consists of the resolution of three disputed questions on the subject of the work.

Fenton was a popular preacher of the day; one of his sermons, 'Of Simonie and Sacriledge,' was published in 1604, from which it appears that he was at that date chaplain to Sir Thomas Egerton, the lord chancellor. Another was published in 1615, 'Upon Oathes,' preached before the Grocers' Company; and a small volume containing four more appeared in 1616.

In 1617, Fenton's successor at Chigwell, Emmanuel Utie, published a posthumous work by Fenton entitled A Treatise against the Necessary Dependence upon that One Head and the present Reconciliation to the Church of Rome. Together with certaine sermons preached in publike assemblies. Utie prefixes a dedication of his own to Sir Francis Bacon, in which he calls the treatise 'the Posthumus [image] of Doctor Fenton', but says that it lacked final revision. In his dedication he alludes to Fenton's earlier dedication of his treatise on usury to Bacon's predecessor as Lord Keeper, Sir Thomas Egerton. The sermons in this volume are six in number, with three of them having been preached before King James.
