= Richard Young (bishop of Rochester) =

15th-century Bishop of Rochester and Bishop of Bangor

- Bishop of Rochester
- Appointed: 28 July 1404
- Term ended: October 1418
- Predecessor: John Bottlesham
- Successor: John Kempe
- Previous post: Bishop of Bangor

Personal details
- Died: October 1418
- Denomination: Catholic

Richard Young (before 1398–1418) was a medieval Bishop of Bangor and Bishop of Rochester.

Young was elected to Bangor about 2 December 1398 and was absent from the see after 1401. He was translated to Rochester on 28 July 1404.

Young died between 17 October and 28 October 1418.

== Citations ==
Catholic Church titles
Preceded by John Swaffham	Bishop of Bangor; 1398–1404	Succeeded by Llywelyn Byford
Preceded by John Bottlesham	Bishop of Rochester; 1404–1418	Succeeded by John Kemp
