= Waleran (bishop of Rochester) =

12th-century Bishop of Rochester

- Bishop of Rochester
- Elected: 9 or 10 October 1182
- Term ended: 29 August 1184
- Predecessor: Walter
- Successor: Gilbert Glanvill
- Previous post: Archdeacon of Bayeux

Orders
- Ordination: 18 December 1182
- Consecration: 19 December 1182

Personal details
- Died: 29 August 1184
- Denomination: Catholic

Waleran was a medieval Bishop of Rochester.

Waleran was archdeacon of the diocese of Bayeux and a clerk serving Richard of Dover, Archbishop of Canterbury.

Waleran was elected on 9 October or 10 October 1182 and was ordained a priest on 18 December 1182. He was consecrated on 19 December 1182.

Waleran died on 29 August 1184.

== Citations ==
Catholic Church titles
Preceded by Walter	Bishop of Rochester; 1182–1184	Succeeded by Gilbert Glanvill
