= Cyneferth =

10th-century Bishop of Rochester

- Bishop of Rochester
- Appointed: between 909 and 926
- Term ended: between January 933 and May 934
- Predecessor: Ceolmund
- Successor: Burgric

Orders
- Consecration: between 909 and 926

Personal details
- Died: between January 933 and May 934
- Denomination: Christian

Cyneferth (or Cynefrith) was a medieval Bishop of Rochester. He was consecrated between 909 and 926. He died between January 933 and May 934.

== Citations ==
Christian titles
Preceded by Ceolmund	Bishop of Rochester c. 917–c. 933	Succeeded by Burgric
