= Thomas Brinton =

14th-century Bishop of Rochester

- Bishop of Rochester
- Appointed: 31 January 1373
- Term ended: 4 May 1389
- Predecessor: Thomas Trilleck
- Successor: William Bottlesham

Orders
- Consecration: 6 February 1373

Personal details
- Died: 4 May 1389
- Denomination: Catholic

Thomas Brinton was a medieval Bishop of Rochester.

Brinton was nominated on 31 January 1373 and consecrated on 6 February 1373. He died on 4 May 1389.

A certain sermon of his, catalogued as Sermon 69 in collections of his work, was preached in 1376 during the meeting of the Good Parliament. He mentions an imagined parliament of rats and mice (referring to the fable of belling the cat), and this image is generally considered to have inspired the similar image in the prologue of Piers Plowman.

== Citations ==
Catholic Church titles
Preceded by Thomas Trilleck	Bishop of Rochester; 1373–1389	Succeeded by William Bottlesham
