= Siward (bishop of Rochester) =

11th-century Bishop of Rochester

- Bishop of Rochester
- Appointed: 1058
- Term ended: 1075
- Predecessor: Godwine II
- Successor: Arnost
- Other post: Abbot of Chertsey

Orders
- Consecration: 1058

Personal details
- Died: 1075
- Denomination: Catholic

Siward (or Sigweard) was a medieval Bishop of Rochester.

== Life ==
Siward was abbot of Chertsey Abbey, a Benedictine abbey in Surrey before he was selected for the see of Rochester. He was consecrated in 1058. He died in 1075. His death was commemorated on 30 October, so he probably died on that date in 1075. After the appointment of Lanfranc as Archbishop of Canterbury, the new archbishop found only four canons at Rochester under Siward's authority.

== Citations ==
Catholic Church titles
Preceded by Godwine II	Bishop of Rochester; 1058–1075	Succeeded by Arnost
