= William Barlow (bishop of Lincoln) =

Bishop of Rochester; Bishop of Lincoln

- Bishop of Lincoln
- Church: Church of England
- Diocese: Diocese of Lincoln
- Elected: 1608
- Term ended: 1613
- Predecessor: William Chaderton
- Successor: Richard Neile
- Other posts: Bishop of Rochester; 1605–1608; Dean of Chester

Personal details
- Died: 1613
- Buried: Buckden Palace
- Denomination: Anglican
- Profession: Scholar
- Education: St John's College, Cambridge

William Barlow (died 1613) was an Anglican priest and courtier during the reign of James I of England. He served as Bishop of Rochester in 1605 and Bishop of Lincoln in the Church of England from 1608 until his death. He had also served the church as Rector of St Dunstan's, Stepney in Middlesex and of Orpington, in Kent. He was also Dean of Chester Cathedral, and secured prebends in Chiswick and Westminster.

== Career ==
As a trusted member of the court, he was appointed to the directorship of the "Second Westminster Company" charged by James with translating the New Testament epistles for the King James Version of the Bible. He participated in the early planning for the translation, and had supported the scholarship of linguist Edward Lively, among other contributions to the project. He also worked with Roger Fenton.

Barlow's scholarly career began at St John's College, Cambridge, where he had graduated in 1584, earned a Master of Arts in 1587, and was admitted as a Fellow in 1590. His publications showed his talents both for scholarship and preferment.

== Death ==
Barlow was buried at St Mary's Church, Buckden, Huntingdonshire. His wife's name is unknown but his daughter and co-heir, Alice, married Sir Henry Yelverton, Knt.

== See also ==
- John Young (bishop of Rochester)
- Richard Neile

Church of England titles
Preceded by John Young	Bishop of Rochester; 1605–1608	Succeeded by Richard Neile
Preceded by William Chaderton	Bishop of Lincoln; 1608–1613	Succeeded by Richard Neile
