= John II (bishop of Rochester) =

12th-century Bishop of Rochester

- Bishop of Rochester
- Appointed: c. 1139
- Term ended: 1142
- Predecessor: John
- Successor: Ascelin

Orders
- Consecration: c. 1139

Personal details
- Died: 1142
- Denomination: Catholic

John II (sometimes John of Séez) was a medieval Bishop of Rochester, England.

== Life ==
John was consecrated around 1139. He died in 1142. He may have been appointed by the pope.

== Citations ==
Catholic Church titles
Preceded by John	Bishop of Rochester; 1137–1142	Succeeded by Ascelin
