= Ælfstan (bishop of Rochester) =

10th-century Bishop of Rochester

- Bishop of Rochester
- Appointed: before 964
- Term ended: between 994 and 995
- Predecessor: Beorhtsige
- Successor: Godwine I

Orders
- Consecration: before 964

Personal details
- Died: between 994 and 995
- Denomination: Christian

Ælfstan was a medieval Bishop of Rochester. He was consecrated sometime before 964. He died between 994 and 995.

== Citations ==
Christian titles
Preceded by Beorhtsige	Bishop of Rochester before 964–c. 995	Succeeded by Godwine I
