= Curll baronets =

Extinct baronetcy in the Baronetage of England

The Curll Baronetcy, of Soberton in the County of Southampton, was a title in the Baronetage of England. It was created on 20 June 1678 for Walter Curll, the son of the Right Reverend Walter Curll, Bishop of Winchester from 1632 to 1647. The title became extinct on Curll's death in circa 1679.

== Curll baronets, of Soberton (1678) ==
Escutcheon of the Curll baronets of Soberton

- Sir Walter Curll, 1st Baronet (died c. 1679)
