= John Mann (bishop) =

John Charles Mann (1880 – January 19, 1967) was an English Anglican bishop who served as Bishop of Kyushu in Japan.

A graduate of the University of Glasgow, he was ordained in 1903. During his first curacy at St Luke Maidstone he applied to be a CMS missionary, His mission work for the Nippon Sei Ko Kai started in Nagasaki in 1905. He was consecrated Bishop of Kyushu, an Anglican diocese in 1935. He served until 1940. In retirement he was an Assistant Bishop in the Diocese of Rochester.

Secretary of the CMS and former Bishop in Kyushu (Nippon Sei Ko Kai). John Charles Mann (6 February 1880 – 28 April 1967) was made deacon on Trinity Sunday 1903 (7 June), by Randall Davidson, Archbishop of Canterbury, at Canterbury Cathedral.
