= Gundulf of Rochester =

11th and 12th-century Bishop of Rochester

Gundulf
- Bishop of Rochester
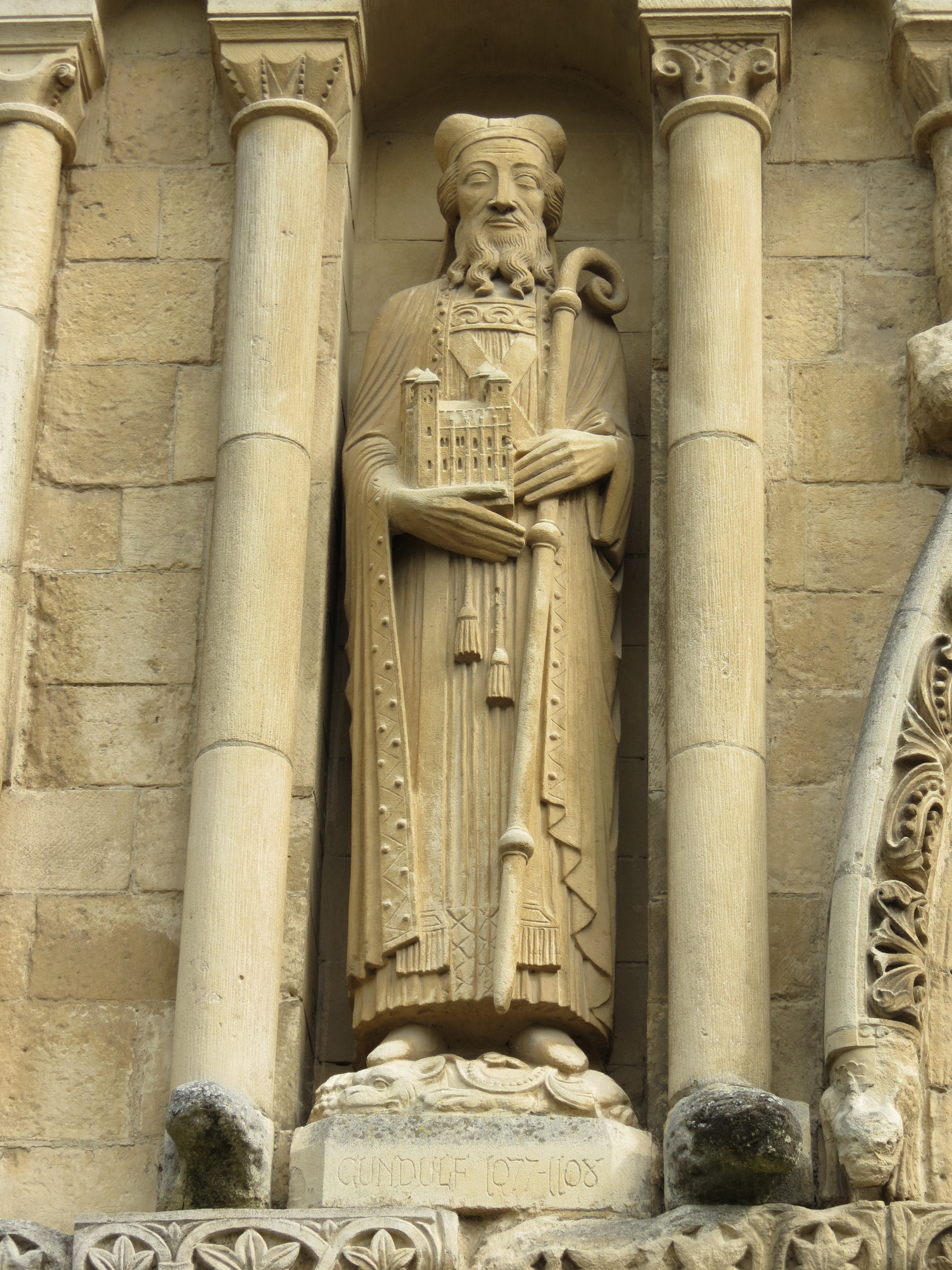
- Appointed: 1075
- Term ended: 7 March 1108
- Predecessor: Arnost
- Successor: Ralph d'Escures
- Other post: monk of St. Etienne in Caen

Orders
- Consecration: 19 March 1077

Personal details
- Born: c. 1024
- Died: 7 March 1108
- Denomination: Catholic

Gundulf (or Gundulph) (c. 1024 – 1108) was a Norman monk who went to England following the Norman Conquest of 1066. He was appointed Bishop of Rochester and Prior of the Cathedral Priory there. He built several castles, including Rochester, Colchester and the White Tower of the Tower of London, and the Priory and Cathedral Church of Rochester.

== Life ==
Gundulf was a monk of Bec Abbey in Normandy and a friend, pupil and also chamberlain of Lanfranc. He was a monk of St. Etienne in Caen before he went to England in 1070, as one of several clergy from Bec and St Etienne. He was one of the most important of those chosen by Lanfranc to help him with the reorganisation of English monasticism, as Lanfranc had been charged to do, following his appointment as Archbishop of Canterbury by King William I.

In 1075 at Lanfranc's instigation, King William I agreed to the appointment of Gundulf as Bishop of Rochester and Gundulf was consecrated on 19 March 1077. Earlier that year Lanfranc had recovered much of the lands once belonging to St. Andrews Church at Rochester from the king's half-brother Odo and when Gundulf was enthroned Lanfranc endowed much of this property back to the church. This restored income enabled Gundulf to start reconstruction work on the almost derelict church building in 1080.

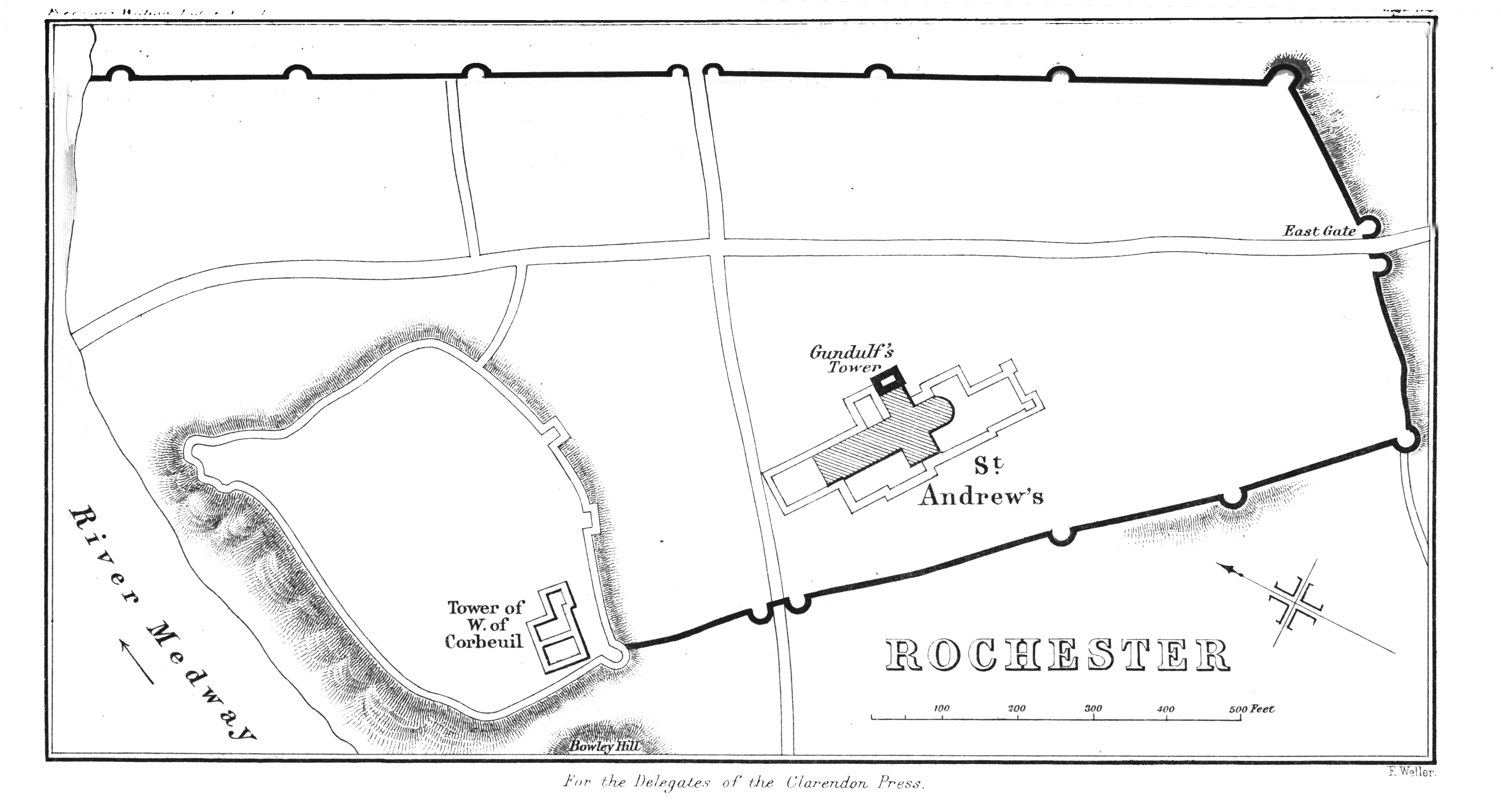
Map of Medieval Rochester, showing the tower that Gundulf built. From E. A. Freeman's The Reign of William Rufus 1882

In 1078 King William used Gundulf's skill in the construction of the White Tower: the keep of the Tower of London, he was described as "competent and skilled at building in stone and was the principle overseer and surveyor of the White Tower of London"; also the castle at Colchester which was started around 1080. Colchester is attributed to Gundulf on the basis of the similarity in plan and design to the White Tower. In 1080 he was responsible for St. Leonard's Tower which became the tower of the monastic cell of St. Leonard's, belonging to Malling Abbey. Sometime around 1092 Gundulf founded the abbey of St Mary's, at West Malling, Kent for Benedictine nuns. He was also responsible for the founding of St. Bartholomew's Hospital, Rochester, the chapel of which is original and still extant.

In 1083 the Cathedral Priory of St. Andrew the Apostle was founded at Rochester with Gundulf as Prior. He personally purchased a great deal of property for his house and also acquired other properties as the Priory found continued favour with the Norman kings. Together with Archbishop Lanfranc he began the construction of the monastery buildings and continued work on the church. Later Gundulf had the relics of St. Paulinus, a previous Bishop of Rochester, housed in a silver shrine at the church. By the time of Gundulf's death on 7 March 1108 the nave and western front of the church had been completed.

== King's Engineers and the Corps of Royal Engineers ==
Bishop Gundulf's talent for architecture had been spotted by King William I and was put to good use in Rochester where he was sent as bishop. Almost immediately the king appointed him to supervise the construction of Colchester Castle in 1075, the blue print for the White Tower, now the central part of the Tower of London, in 1078. Under William Rufus he also undertook building work on Rochester Castle. Having served three Kings of England and earning "the favour of then all", Gundulf was accepted as the first King's Engineer. Gundulf died in 1108, and a modern statue of him now adorns the west door of Rochester Cathedral.

Because of his 'military' engineering talent, Bishop Gundulf is regarded as the "father of the Corps of Royal Engineers", military engineers of the British Army. The Corps claims a line of 'King's Engineers' pre-dating the engineers of the Board of Ordnance in 1414 and the formal founding of the corps in 1716, and going all the way back to Gundulf of Rochester. This shared heritage and the close proximity to the cathedral of the Royal School of Military Engineering in Brompton nearby means the Corps of Royal Engineers and Rochester Cathedral maintain strong links to this day.

== Gallery of architectural work ==
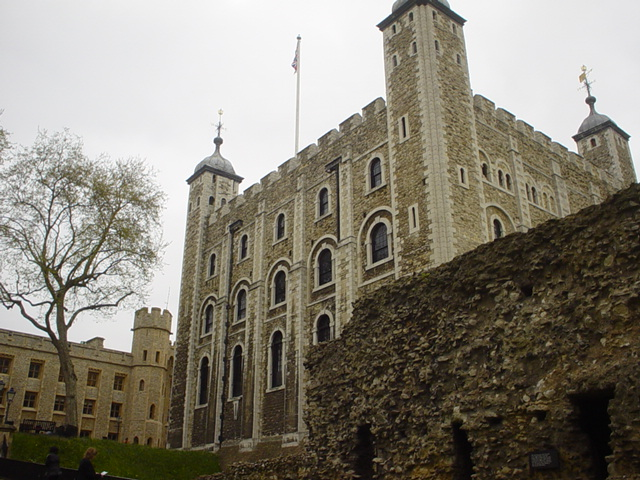
White Tower, Tower of London

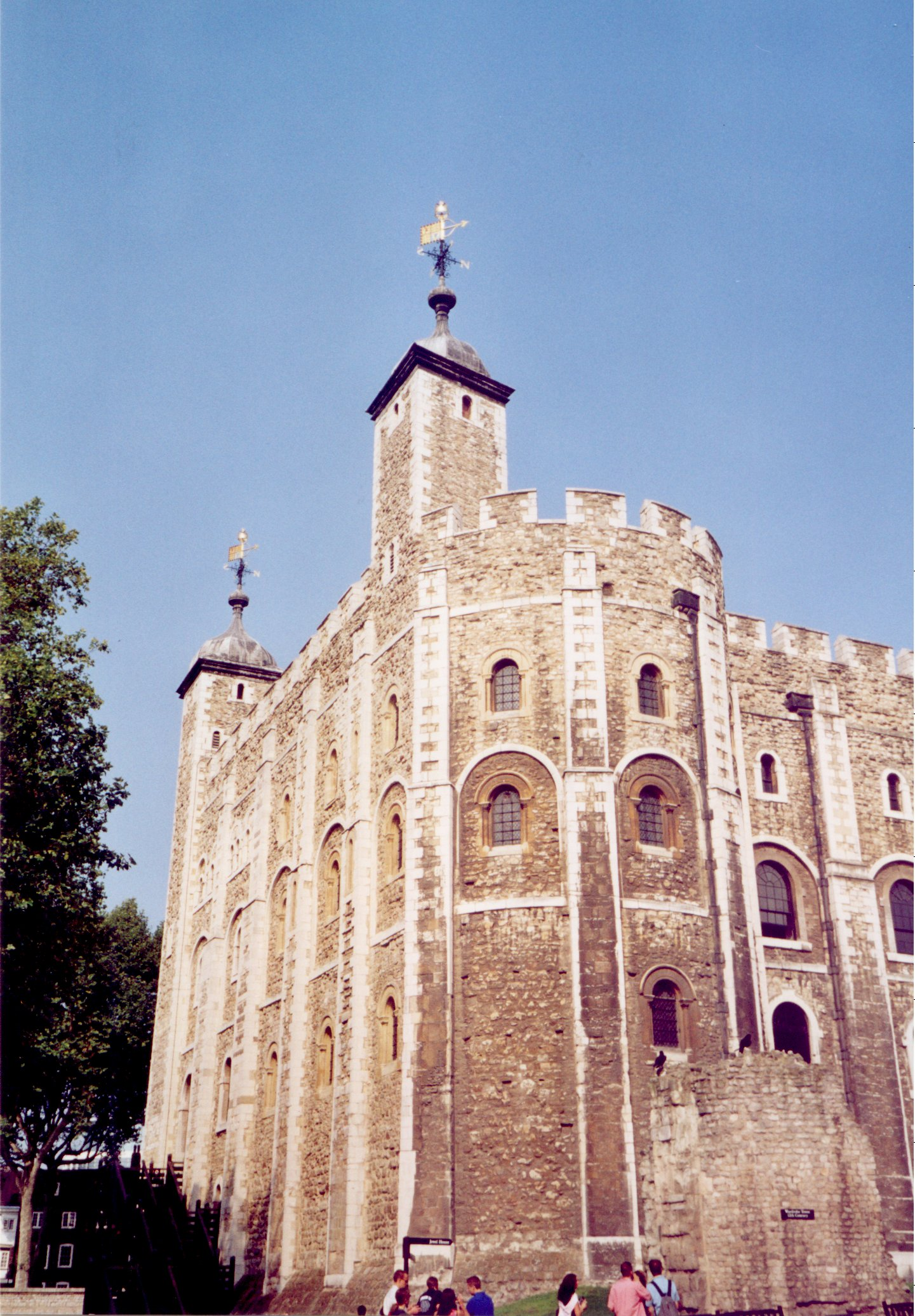
White Tower, Tower of London, showing apse of chapel

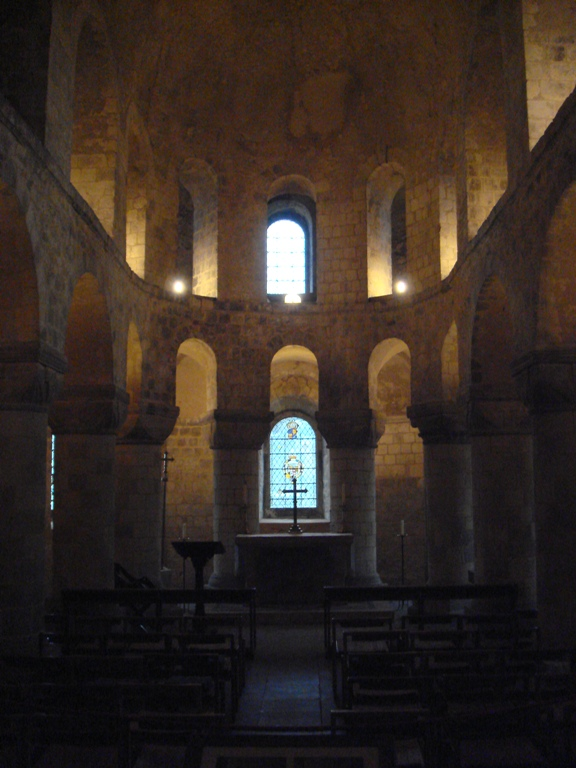
Chapel of St. John, White Tower, Tower of London

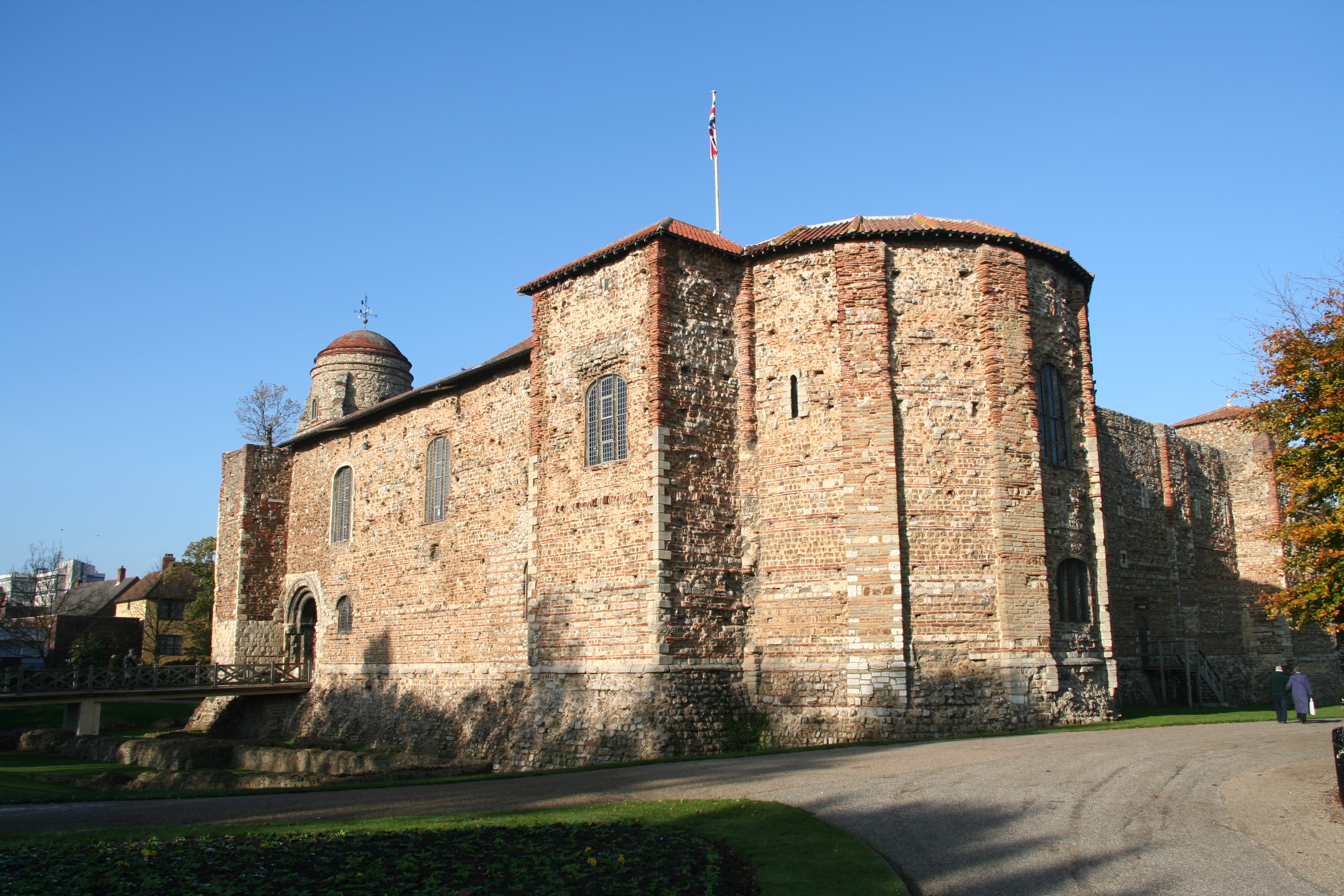
Colchester Castle, showing the external apse of the chapel; the two upper floors were demolished in the 18th century

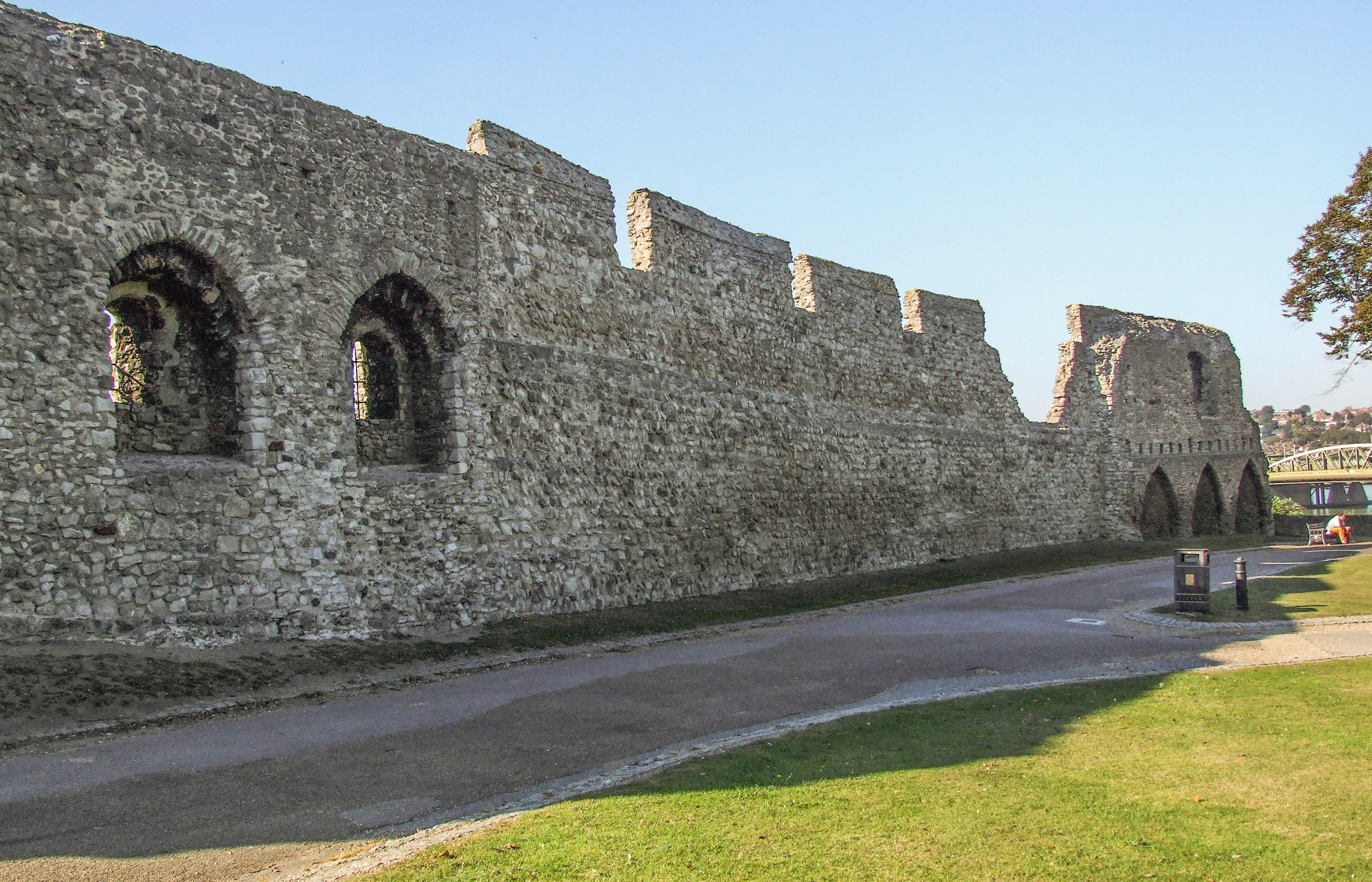
The vestiges of Gundulf's work at Rochester Castle

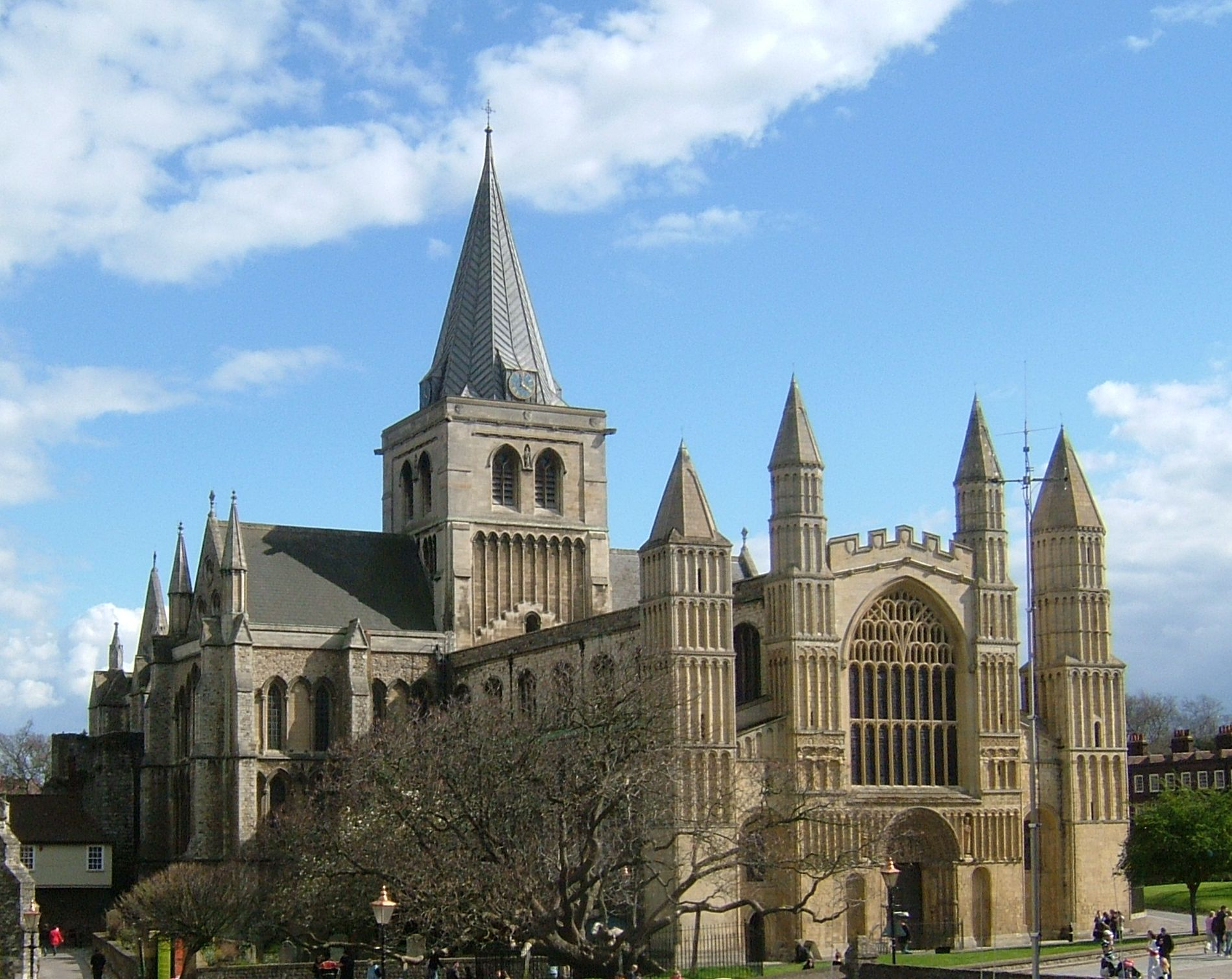
Rochester Cathedral

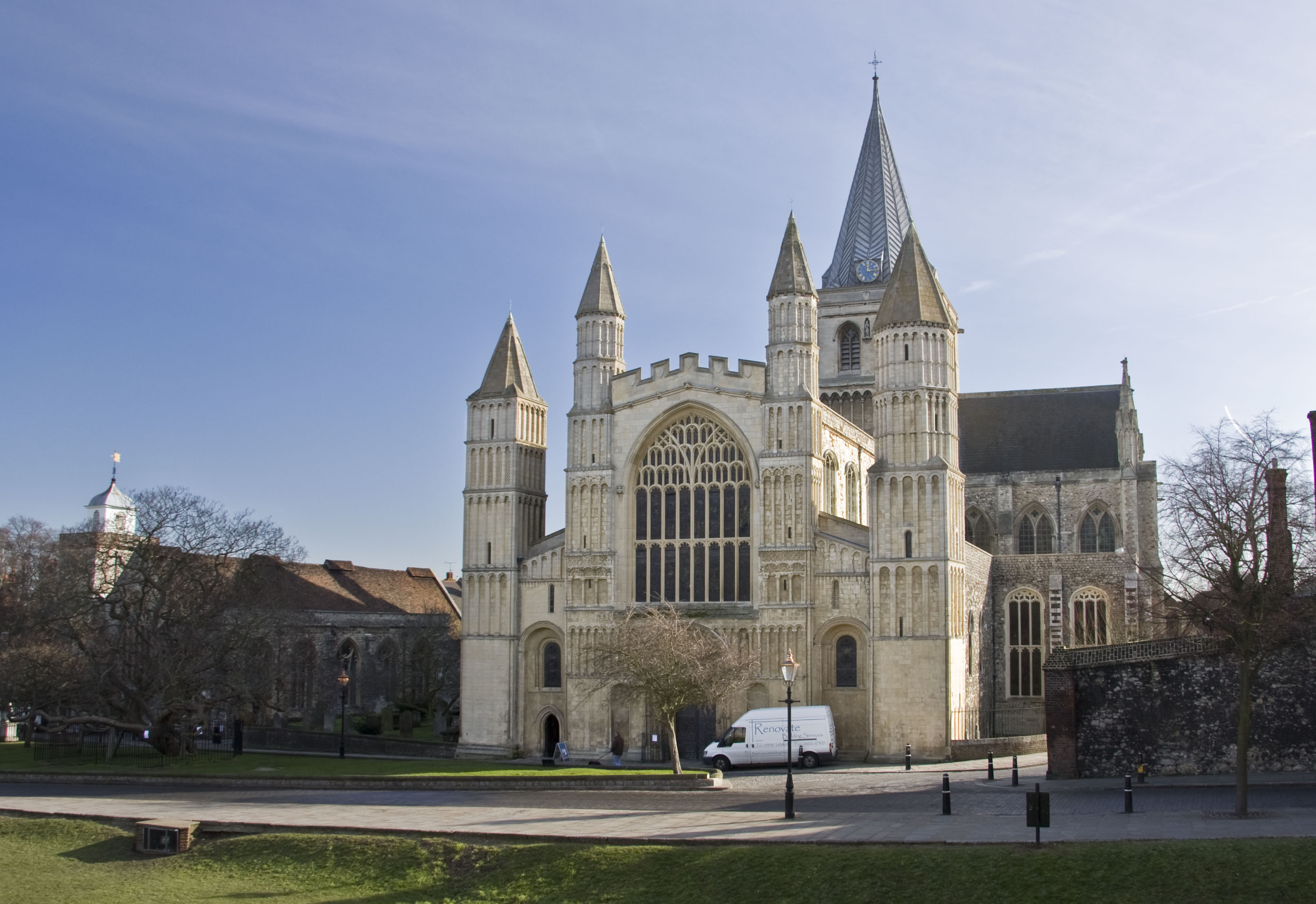
Rochester Cathedral from the Castle

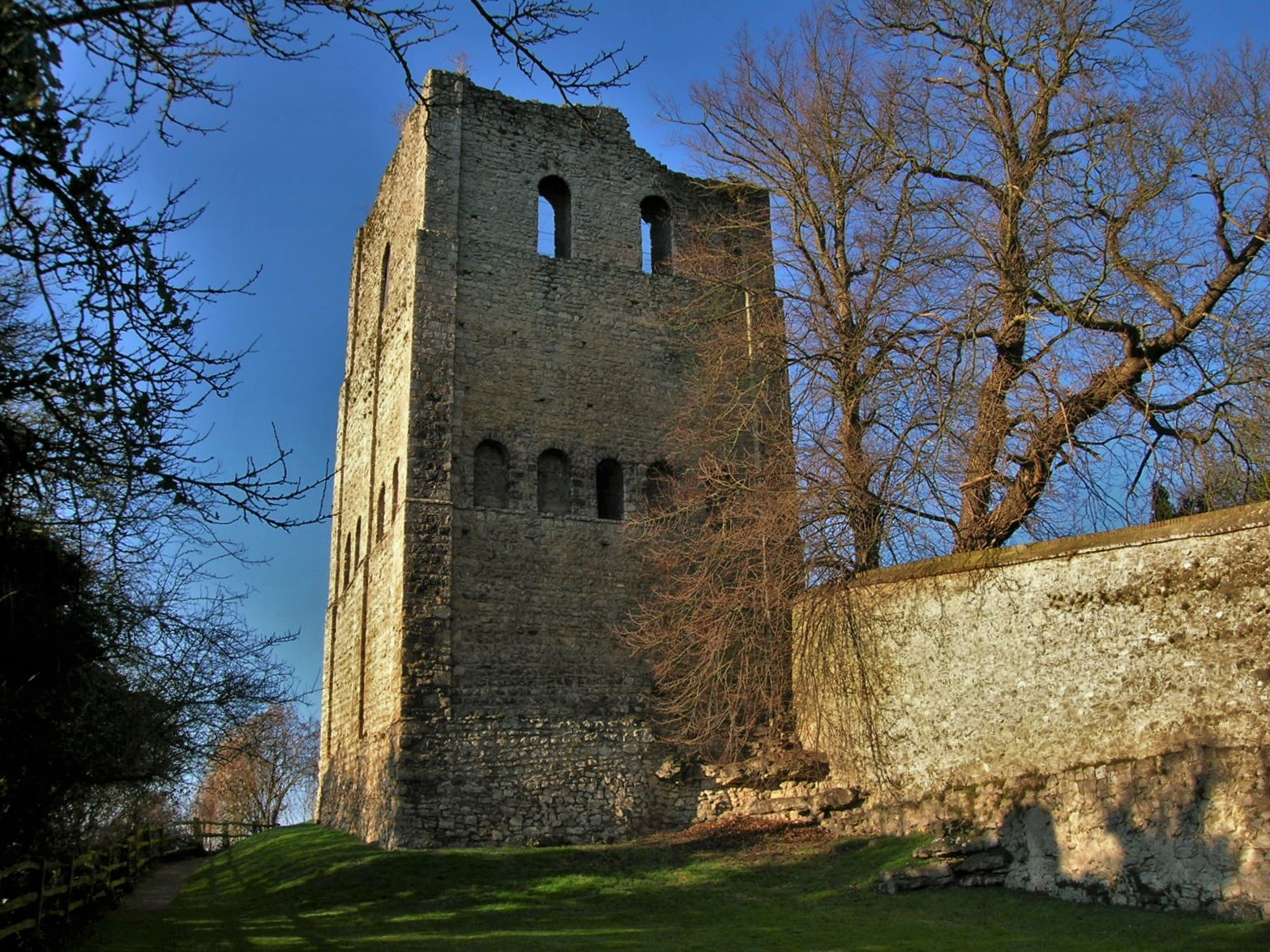
St Leonard's Tower, West Malling

== Citations ==
Catholic Church titles
Preceded by Arnost	Bishop of Rochester; 1077–1108	Succeeded by Ralph d'Escures
