= Bishop of Rochester =

Diocesan bishop in the Church of England

- Bishopric

anglican
- Arms of the Bishop of Rochester: Argent, on a saltire gules an escallop or
- Incumbent; Jonathan Gibbs

Location
- Ecclesiastical province: Canterbury
- Residence: Bishopscourt, Rochester

Information
- First holder: Justus
- Established: 604
- Diocese: Rochester
- Cathedral: Rochester Cathedral

The Bishop of Rochester is the ordinary of the Church of England's Diocese of Rochester in the Province of Canterbury.

The town of Rochester has the bishop's seat, at the Cathedral Church of Christ and the Blessed Virgin Mary, which was founded in 604. After the English Reformation, during the late 17th and 18th centuries, it was customary for the Bishop of Rochester to also be appointed Dean of Westminster. The practice ended in 1802. The diocese covers two London boroughs and West Kent, which includes Medway and Maidstone.

The bishop's residence is Bishopscourt in Rochester. His Latin episcopal signature is: "(firstname) Roffen", Roffensis being the genitive case of the Latin name of the see. The office was created in 604 at the founding of the diocese in the Kingdom of Kent under King Æthelberht.

Jonathan Gibbs has served as Bishop of Rochester since the confirmation of his election, on 24 May 2022.

== History ==
The Diocese of Rochester was historically the oldest and smallest of all the suffragan sees of Canterbury. It was founded by St Augustine, who in 604 consecrated St Justus as its first bishop. (After two more Roman bishops, all subsequent bishops until 1066, beginning with Ithamar, were drawn from the Christianised inhabitants of Kent.) The diocesan territory consisted roughly of the western part of Kent, separated from the rest of the county by the River Medway, though the diocesan boundaries did not follow the river very closely. The restricted territory of the diocese meant that it needed only one archdeacon to supervise all 97 parishes.

From the foundation of the see, the Archbishop of Canterbury had enjoyed the privilege of nominating the bishop, but Archbishop Theobald transferred the right to the Benedictine monks of the cathedral, who exercised it for the first time in 1148.

== List of bishops ==
=== Pre-Conquest ===
Pre-Conquest Bishops of Rochester
From	Until	Incumbent	Notes
604	624	Justus	Translated to Canterbury.
624	624 or 625	Romanus	Drowned in the Mediterranean Sea off Italy
624 or 625	633	Seat vacant	
633	644	Paulinus	Translated from York.
unknown	bet. 655–664	Ithamar	
bet. 655–664	c. 664	Damianus	
possibly 669	676	Putta	Resigned. Translated to Hereford.
possibly 676	678	Cwichelm	Resigned.
possibly 678	bet. 699–716	Gebmund	
bet. 699–716	726	Tobias	
possibly 727	739	Ealdwulf	
possibly 740	747	Dunn	
747	bet. 765–772	Eardwulf	
bet. 765–772	bet. 781–785	Diora	
bet. 781–785	803 or 804	Waermund (I)	
804	bet. 842–844	Beornmod	
844	bet. 845–868	Tatnoth	
bet. 845–868	bet. 845–868	Badenoth	
bet. 845–868	bet. 845–868	Waermund (II)	
bet. 845–868	bet. 868–880	Cuthwulf	
bet. 868–880	bet. 893–896	Swithwulf	
bet. 893–900	bet. 909–926	Ceolmund	
bet. 909–926	933 or 934	Cyneferth	
933 or 934	bet. 946–964	Burgric	
bet. 946–949	bet. 955–964	Beorhtsige	
bet. ? – 964	994 or 995	Ælfstan	
994 or 995	bet. c. 1013 – ?	Godwine (I)	
bet. c. 1013 – ?	bet. 1046–1058	Godwine (II)	
1058	1075	Siward	

=== Conquest to Reformation ===
Bishops of Rochester (Catholic)
From	Until	Incumbent	Notes
1076	1077	Arnost	Died in office.
1077	1108	Gundulf	Builder of Rochester Castle, the White Tower and Father of the Corps of Royal Engineers. Died in office.
1108	1114	Ralph d'Escures	Translated to Canterbury.
1114	1124	Ernulf	Died in office.
1125	1137	John	Died in office.
1139	1142	John II	Died in office.
1142	1148	Ascelin	Died in office.
1148	1182	Walter	Died in office.
1182	1184	Waleran	Died in office.
1185	1214	Gilbert Glanvill	Died in office.
1215	1226	Benedict of Sausetun	Also recorded as Benedict of Sawston. Died in office.
1227	1235	Henry Sandford	Died in office.
1235	1250	Richard Wendene	Died in office.
1251	1274	Lawrence of St Martin	Died in office.
1274	1277	Walter de Merton	Formerly Archdeacon of Bath and Lord Chancellor. Died in office.
1278	1283	John Bradfield	Died in office.
1283		John Kirkby (bishop-elect)	Elected, but resigned without consecration. Later became Bishop of Ely.
1283	1291	Thomas Ingoldsthorpe	Died in office.
1292	1317	Thomas Wouldham	Died in office.
1319	1352	Hamo Hethe	Resigned.
1353	1360	John Sheppey	Died in office.
1362	1364	William Whittlesey	Translated to Worcester.
1364	1372	Thomas Trilleck	Died in office.
1373	1389	Thomas Brinton	Died in office.
1389	1400	William Bottlesham	Also recorded as William Bottisham and Botklisham. Translated from Llandaff. Died in office.
1400	1404	John Bottlesham	Died in office.
1404	1418	Richard Young	Translated from Bangor. Died in office.
1419	1421	John Kemp	Translated to Chichester.
1421	1434	John Langdon	Died in office.
1435	1436	Thomas Brunce	Translated to Norwich.
1437	1444	William Wells	Died in office.
1444	1467	John Low	Translated from St Asaph. Died in office.
1468	1472	Thomas Rotherham	Also recorded as Thomas Scott. Translated to Lincoln.
1472	1476	John Alcock	Translated to Worcester.
1476	1480	John Russell	Translated to Lincoln.
1480	1492	Edmund Audley	Translated to Hereford.
1493	1496	Thomas Savage	Translated to London.
1497	1503	Richard FitzJames	Translated to Chichester.

=== During the Reformation ===
Bishops of Rochester (Catholic)
From	Until	Incumbent	Notes
1504	1535	John Fisher	Cardinal, martyr and saint. Executed.
1535	1539	John Hilsey	Also recorded as John Hildesleigh. Died in office.
1540	1544	Nicholas Heath	Translated to Worcester.
1544	1547	Henry Holbeach	Translated from Bristol. Afterwards translated to Lincoln.
1547	1550	Nicholas Ridley	Translated to London. Martyr. Executed.
1550	1551	John Ponet	Also recorded as John Poynet. Translated to Winchester.
1551	1552	John Scory	Translated to Chichester.
1554	1558	Maurice Griffith	Also recorded Maurice Griffin. Died in office.

=== Post-Reformation ===
Bishops of Rochester (Church of England)
From	Until	Incumbent	Notes
1559		Edmund Allen (bishop-elect)	Elected, but died before consecration.
1560	1571	Edmund Gheast	Also recorded as Edmund Guest. Translated to Salisbury.
1572	1575	Edmund Freke	Translated to Norwich.
1576	1577	John Piers	Translated to Salisbury.
1578	1605	John Young	Died in office.
1605	1608	William Barlow	Translated to Lincoln.
1608	1610	Richard Neile	Translated to Lichfield and Coventry.
1611	1628	John Buckeridge	Translated to Ely.
1628	1629	Walter Curle	Translated to Bath and Wells.
1630	1637	John Bowle	Died in office.
1638	1646	John Warner	Deprived when the English episcopate was abolished by Parliament.
1646	1660	The see was abolished during the Commonwealth and the Protectorate.	
1660	1666	John Warner (restored)	Reinstated on the restoration of the episcopate. Died in office.
1666	1683	John Dolben	Translated to York.
1683	1684	Francis Turner	Translated to Ely.
1684	1713	Thomas Sprat	Died in office.
1713	1723	Francis Atterbury	Deprived.
1723	1731	Samuel Bradford	Translated from Carlisle.
1731	1756	Joseph Wilcocks	Translated from Gloucester. Died in office.
1756	1774	Zachary Pearce	Translated from Bangor. Died in office.
1774	1793	John Thomas	Died in office.
1793	1802	Samuel Horsley	Translated from St David's. Afterwards translated to St Asaph.
1802	1808	Thomas Dampier	Translated to Ely.
1809	1827	Walker King	Died in office.
1827		Hugh Percy	Translated to Carlisle.
1827	1860	George Murray	Translated from Sodor and Man. Died in office.
1860	1867	Joseph Wigram	Died in office.
1867	1877	Thomas Legh Claughton	Translated to St Albans.
1877	1891	Anthony Thorold	Translated to Winchester.
1891	1895	Randall Davidson	Translated to Winchester.
1895	1905	Edward Talbot	Translated to Southwark.
1905	1930	John Harmer	Translated from Adelaide. Retired.
1930	1939	Linton Smith	Translated from Hereford. Retired.
1940	1960	Christopher Chavasse	Retired.
1961	1988	David Say	Retired
1988	1994	Michael Turnbull	Translated to Durham
1994	2009	Michael Nazir-Ali	Retired. Later received into the Catholic Church as a priest of the Ordinariate.
2010	2021	James Langstaff	Translated from Lynn; retired 31 July 2021
2021	2022	Simon Burton-Jones, Bishop of Tonbridge	Acting diocesan bishop during vacancy.
2022	present	Jonathan Gibbs	Translated from Huddersfield; election confirmed 24 May 2022.

== Assistant bishops ==
Among those called Assistant Bishop of Rochester, or coadjutor bishop, were:

- 1889–1891 (res.): Alfred Barry, a Canon of Windsor and former Anglican Bishop of Sydney
- 1928 – 1939 (ret.): Lanchester King, Canon Residentiary of Rochester Cathedral and former Bishop of Madagascar
- 1941 – 1947 (res.) & 1950 – 1967 (d.): John Mann, Secretary of the CMS and former Bishop in Kyushu (Nippon Sei Ko Kai)
- 1965 – 1978 (ret.): Keith Russell, Vicar of Tunbridge Wells (until 1973), Rector of Hever with Markbeech thereafter, and former Bishop of Northern Uganda
- 1994 – 1997 (res.): David Evans, Gen. Sec. of SAMS and former Bishop in Peru
