= Ascelin (bishop) =

12th-century Bishop of Rochester

- Bishop of Rochester
- Appointed: 1142
- Term ended: 24 January 1148
- Predecessor: John II
- Successor: Walter
- Other post: Prior of Dover Priory

Orders
- Consecration: 1142

Personal details
- Died: 24 January 1148
- Denomination: Catholic

Ascelin (or Anselm) was a medieval Bishop of Rochester.

Ascelin was prior of Dover Priory in Kent before being selected as bishop. He was consecrated in 1142. He died on 24 January 1148.

== Citations ==
Catholic Church titles
Preceded by John II	Bishop of Rochester; 1142–1148	Succeeded by Walter
