= Godwine II (bishop of Rochester) =

11th-century Bishop of Rochester

- Bishop of Rochester
- Appointed: c. 1013
- Term ended: between 1046 and 1058
- Predecessor: Godwine I
- Successor: Siward

Orders
- Consecration: c. 1013

Personal details
- Died: between 1046 and 1058
- Denomination: Christian

Godwine was a medieval Bishop of Rochester. He was consecrated around 1013. He died between 1046 and 1058.

== Citations ==
Christian titles
Preceded by Godwine I	Bishop of Rochester c. 1013–c. 1052	Succeeded by Siward
