= Walter Curle =

English bishop (1575–1647)

- Bishop of Winchester
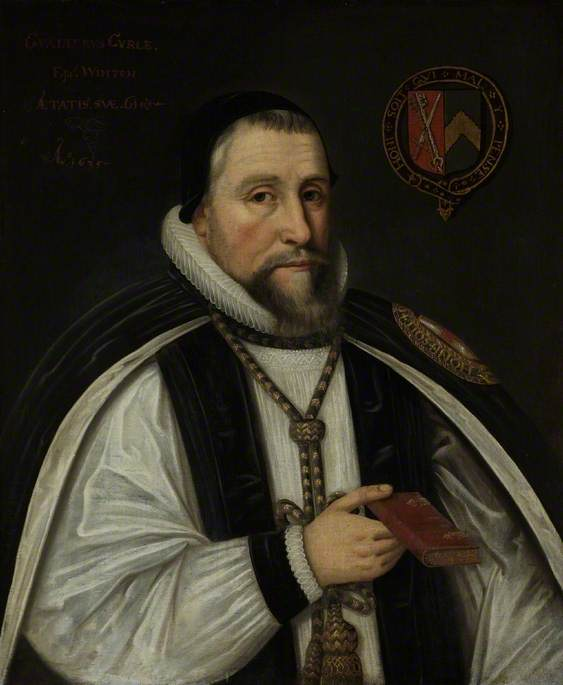
- Church: Church of England
- Diocese: Diocese of Winchester
- Elected: 16 November 1632
- Term ended: 1646 (See abolished)
- Predecessor: Richard Neile
- Successor: Brian Duppa
- Other posts: Bishop of Rochester; 1628–1629; Bishop of Bath and Wells; 1629–1632

Personal details
- Born: 1575 Hatfield, Hertfordshire
- Died: 1647 (aged 71–72)
- Denomination: Anglican
- Education: Christ's College, Cambridge

Walter Curle (or Curll; 1575 – 1647) was an English bishop, a close supporter of William Laud. Born in Hatfield, Hertfordshire, he was educated at St Albans School and at Christ's College, Cambridge (matriculated c. 1592), transferring to Peterhouse (BA c. 1595; MA in 1598), of which college he later was elected Fellow.

He was bishop of Winchester from 1632 to 1646. When in 1645 Parliamentary forces under Oliver Cromwell captured Winchester, he went into exile at Soberton. He was deprived of his See by Parliament on 9 October 1646, as episcopacy was abolished for the duration of the Commonwealth and the Protectorate.

He was bishop of Rochester in 1628, and bishop of Bath and Wells from 1629 to 1632. His translation caused the vacancy as Rector of Bemerton that gave the poet George Herbert a living there. He was Dean of Lichfield 1622 to 1628. Curll's son Walter Curll was created a baronet in 1678 (see Curll baronets).

== Notes ==
Church of England titles
| Preceded by John Buckeridge | Bishop of Rochester; 1628–1629 | Succeeded by John Bowle |
| Preceded by Leonard Mawe | Bishop of Bath and Wells; 1629–1632 | Succeeded by William Piers |
| Preceded by Richard Neile | Bishop of Winchester; 1632–1646 | Vacant Commonwealth Title next held by Brian Duppa |
