= Ernulf =

French Benedictine monk (1040–1124)

- Bishop of Rochester
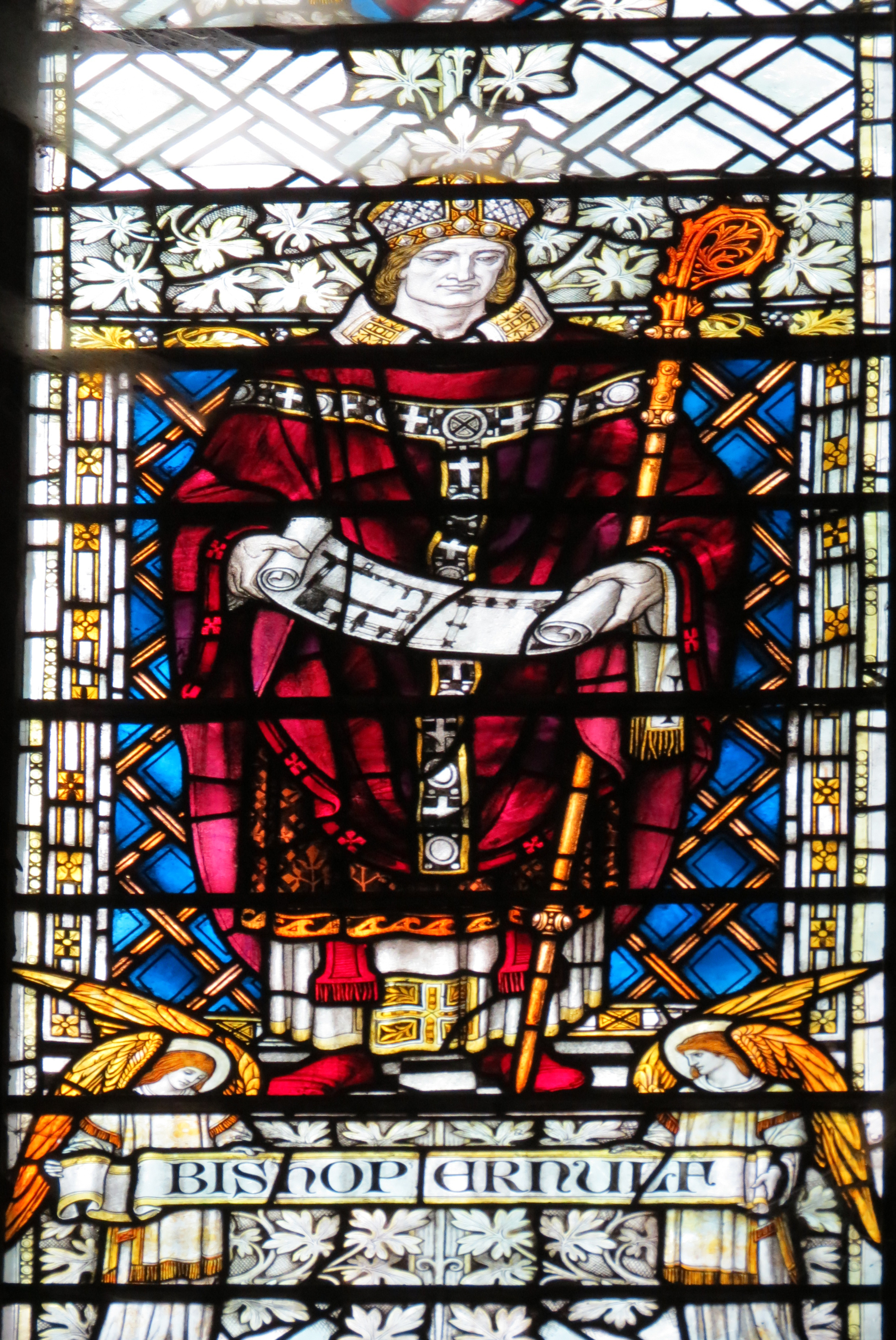
- Appointed: 28 September 1114
- Term ended: 15 March 1124
- Predecessor: Ralph d'Escures
- Successor: John
- Other posts: Prior of Christ Church, Canterbury; Abbot of Peterborough

Orders
- Consecration: 26 December 1115

Personal details
- Born: 1040 Beauvais
- Died: 15 March 1124 (aged 83–84)
- Denomination: Catholic

Ernulf (1040 – 15 March 1124) was a French Benedictine monk who became prior of Christ Church in Canterbury, abbot of Peterborough, and bishop of Rochester in England. A jurist and an architect as well, he was responsible for greatly expanding Canterbury Cathedral during his time there.

== Life ==
Ernulf was born in 1040 in Beauvais, France. He studied under Lanfranc at the monastery of Bec, entered the Benedictine Order, and lived at the monastery of St-Lucien, Beauvais. At the suggestion of Lanfranc, he went to England some time after 1070 and joined the monks of Canterbury. He studied under Ivo of Chartres and was considered an expert on canon law.

Ernulf was made prior by Archbishop Anselm in 1096 and began the expansion of Lanfranc's rebuilt Canterbury Cathedral, taking down the eastern part of the church which Lanfranc had built and erecting a far more magnificent structure. This included the famous crypt (Our Lady of the Undercroft), as far as Trinity Tower. The chancel was finished by his successor Conrad. The chapel of St. Andrew is also part of Ernulf's work. In 1107, he was made Abbot of Peterborough, where he was one of the teachers of Hugh Candidus. On 28 September 1114, he was invested as bishop of Rochester by Ralph d'Escures, the archbishop of Canterbury. He was consecrated on 26 December 1115. At Peterborough and Rochester, Ernulf had the old buildings torn down and erected new dormitories, refectories, chapter houses, etc.

Ernulf is associated with the production of the Textus Roffensis (a large collection of documents relating to the early Church of Rochester which also included the early Kentish law code attributed to King Aethelberht); "Collectanea de rebus eccl. Ruffensis". The collection reflects his interest in and sympathy towards pre-Conquest traditions apparent elsewhere. Aspects of Anglo-Saxon liturgical practice were revived at Canterbury and he may also have influenced the restoration of the shrines and altars to Anglo-Saxon saints to their former prominence during the development of the cathedral. His abbacy at Peterborough additionally seems to have coincided with renewed interest in the Anglo-Saxon Chronicle there. He also authored several canonical and theological treatises.

Ernulf died on 15 March 1124.

== In Literature ==
An excommunication by Bishop Ernulf (styled Ernulfus) is cited as something of a paragon of maledicta (to the degree that it was known as "The Pope's Curse" when first published in 1681 England) in two classic English comic novels: Tristram Shandy by Laurence Sterne and Barchester Towers by Anthony Trollope. The specific reference (Archbishop Slope's manner of performing his duties are being described) in the latter is as follows: "From the poorer classes he exacted and unconditional obedience to set rules of conduct, and if disobeyed he has recourse, like his great ancestor, to the fulminations of an Ernulfus: 'Thou shalt be damned in thy going in and in thy coming out--in thy eating and thy drinking,' &c &c &c."

== Citations ==
Catholic Church titles
Preceded by Ralph d'Escures	Bishop of Rochester; 1114–1124	Succeeded by John
