= Serlo (bishop of Sées) =

Serlo (died 27 October 1123) was the Bishop of Sées from 1091 until his death, and a supporter of the Gregorian reform of the clergy.

== Life ==
According to Orderic Vitalis, Serlo was "the first of the Normans to offer his services to the king", that is, Henry I of England, after the latter's invasion of the Duchy of Normandy in 1105. Earlier that year the church of Tournai-sur-Dive in Serlo's diocese had been burned by Robert de Bellême, and forty-five men and women had died inside. Serlo, who had also crossed to Normandy from England, where he had been in exile, met Henry on Easter eve in the village of Carentan, where he found the church stocked with the possessions of the peasants, who were safeguarding them from the general disorder then wracking the Cotentin. Serlo made this the basis for an appeal to Henry (probably staged) to come to the defence of the people and the Church and depose his brother, the Duke of Normandy, Robert Curthose. This challenge accepted, Serlo continued to berate the king and his nobles for their effeminate manners and dress, especially their long hair, which Serlo himself promptly cut. The first to undergo the shearing were the king and Robert de Meulan. While the lengthy speeches of Serlo are more the invention of Orderic than history, they represent a faithful record of the principles and prejudices of the high clergy of the time: staunchly royalist, stressing the analogy of the body politic.

Serlo died on 27 October 1123 in Sées, in the presence of the papal legates Pietro Pierleoni and Gregory of Sant'Angelo. Again according to Orderic, Serlo bade his clergy to respect the legation as one from the "universal father after God" (post Deum uniuersalis pater) and to treat them properly as masters.
