= List of people from Tonbridge =

This is a list of people from Tonbridge, Kent, England.

== Born in Tonbridge ==
- Elias Allen (1588–1653), maker of sundials and scientific instruments
- Timothy Allen (born 1971), photojournalist^{†}
- Harry Andrews (1911–89), actor
- Anna Atkins (1799–1871), botanist and photographer
- Edwin Bramall (1923–2019), soldier
- Ron Challis (1932–2001), football referee
- John George Children (1777–1852), chemist, mineralogist and zoologist
- William Cobbold (1862–1922), England international football player
- Sir James Darling (1899–1955) Chairman of the Australian Broadcasting Commission
- Marcus Dillistone (born 1961) Royal Premiered British film director, and music producer for the Athens 2004 Olympic Opening & Closing Ceremonies
- Richard de Clare (1130–76), Earl
- Neville Duke (1922–2007), World War II pilot and world air speed holder in 1953
- Desmond Dupré, (1916–1974), lutenist and early music pioneer
- Henry Fowler (1858–1933), educationist
- Robin Hanley (1968–96), cricketer
- Harold Langhorne (1866–1932), soldier
- Shane MacGowan (born 1957), singer-songwriter
- Cecil Powell (1903–1969), Nobel Prize Winner for Physics^{†}
- Reginald Punnett (1875–1967) geneticist
- James Reynolds (1866–1950), cricketer
- Malcolm Simmons (1946–2014) British Speedway Champion 1976–77 and former captain of England team
- Ray Singer (born 19??), record producer
- Johnnie Stewart (1917–2005), television producer
- Walter Tirel (1065–1100+), nobleman
- Sir Skinner Turner (1868–1935), chief judge of the British Supreme Court for China
- James Welldon (1854–1937), Bishop of Calcutta
- Sir Dick White (1906–1983), intelligence officer
- Claud Woolley (1886–1962), cricketer
- Frank Woolley (1887–1978), cricketer
- Ian Wynne (born 1973), Olympic canoeist

== Old Juddians ==
These people attended The Judd School

- Timothy Allen (born 1971), photojournalist
- Fergus Anckorn (born 1918), magician and soldier
- Luke Baldwin (born 1990), rugby player
- Torsten Bell, Labour Party politician
- Humphrey Burton (born 1931), broadcaster, presenter and director
- William Cockcroft (born c1950), Chief Scout Commissioner
- Rob Crilly (born 1973), journalist and author
- Richard Dixon, British chemist, fellow of the Royal Society, and winner of the Rumford Medal
- Neville Duke (1922–2007), World War II pilot and world air speed holder in 1953
- Angus Fairhurst (1966–2008), artist
- Taylor Fawcett, actor from Life of Riley
- David Fulton (born 1971), cricketer
- John Gathercole, (1937–2010), Archdeacon of Dudley
- Max Godden, (died 2000), Archdeacon of Lewis
- Tom Greatrex (born 1974), MP for Rutherglen and Hamilton West
- Harold Hailstone (1897–1982), cartoonist and illustrator; brother of Bernard
- Bernard Hailstone (1910–1987), artist; brother of Harold
- Guy Hands (born 1959), financier
- Donald Hodge (1894–2001), First World War veteran
- Jack Holden (actor), actor
- George Henry Horton (born 1993), filmmaker
- Harry Kendall (born 1996), athlete
- Terence Lewin (1920–99), First Sea Lord and Chief of Defence Staff
- Sir Clive Loader, Air Chief Marshal
- Rob Luft (born 1993), jazz guitarist and composer
- Anton Matusevich (born 2001), British tennis player
- Nathaniel Mellors (born 1974), artist & musician
- James Miller, (born 1976), British novelist and academic
- Richard Moth, former Bishop of the Forces and current Bishop of Arundel and Brighton
- David Moule-Evans (1905–1988), composer
- Mr Bingo (born 1979), illustrator
- Geoffrey Paterson (born 1983), conductor
- Cecil Powell (1903–1969), Nobel prize winner in Physics
- Tom Probert (born 1986), cricketer
- Martin Purdy (born 1981), Rugby Union player
- Stuart Skeates, (born 1966), Major General and former Commandant of the Royal Military Academy Sandhurst
- Tim Stanley, journalist
- Rob Warner (academic), (born 1956), British academic
- James Whiteaker (born 1998), athlete
- Michael Willard, (born 1938) cricketer
- Ronald Williams (1906–79), Bishop of Leicester
- Stewart Wood, Baron Wood of Anfield, Member of the House of Lords

== People connected with Tonbridge ==
- Sir Adrian Baillie (1898–1947), MP for Tonbridge 1937–45
- Hugh de Audley (1289–1347), English ambassador to France, was buried at Tonbridge Priory
- Margaret de Audley (1318–47), baroness and countess, was buried at Tonbridge Priory
- David Bartleet (1929–2002), Bishop of Tonbridge 1982–93
- Brian Castle (born 1949), current bishop of Tonbridge
- Margaret de Clare (1293–1342), countess, was buried at Tonbridge Priory
- Ralph de Stafford (1301–72), nobleman, was buried in Tonbridge Priory
- Richard fitz Gilbert (1030–1091), nobleman, built Tonbridge Castle
- Richard Fitz Gilbert de Clare (died 1136), nobleman, founded Tonbridge Priory and held Tonbridge Castle
- Philip Goodrich (1929–2001), Bishop of Tonbridge from 1973 to 1982
- Jilly Goolden (born 1959), food critic, attended West Kent College
- Arthur Griffith-Boscawen (1865–1946), MP for Tonbridge 1892–1906
- David Halsey (1919–2009), Bishop of Tonbridge 1968–72
- Victoria Hislop (born 1959), author, grew up in Tonbridge
- Dame Kelly Holmes (born 1970), Olympic athlete, attended Hugh Christie School
- Richard Hornby (1922–2007), MP for Tonbridge 1956–74
- Andrea Leadsom (born 1963), educated at Tonbridge Girls' Grammar School
- Robert Norton (1838–1926), MP for Tonbridge 1885–92
- Adrian Quaife-Hobbs (born 1991), racing driver, lives in Tonbridge
- Sophie Rhys-Jones (born 1965), now he Duchess of Edinburgh, attended West Kent College
- Angie Sage (born 1952), author, attended Tonbridge Grammar School for Girls
- Margaret Sharp (born 1938) peer, attended Tonbridge Grammar School for Girls
- Brian Smith (born 1943), Bishop of Tonbridge 1993–2001
- John Stanley (born 1942), MP for Tonbridge and Malling since 1974
- Holman F Stephens (1868–1931), ran a number of railway companies from offices in Tonbridge
- Paul Watson (born 1942), artist and documentary film maker, lives in Tonbridge
- Paul Way (born 1962), golfer, attended Hugh Christie School
- Gerald Williams (1903–89), MP for Tonbridge 1945–56
- Russell White (1896–1979), Bishop of Tonbridge from 1959 to 1968
- Jonathan Williams (born 1993), footballer for Crystal Palace FC, lives in Tonbridge
- Bob Woolmer (1948–2007), cricketer, attended Yardley Court School

== Notes ==
† also Old Juddian.
