= David Silk (priest) =

English Anglican bishop turned Catholic priest (1936–2023)

The Reverend Monsignor David Silk
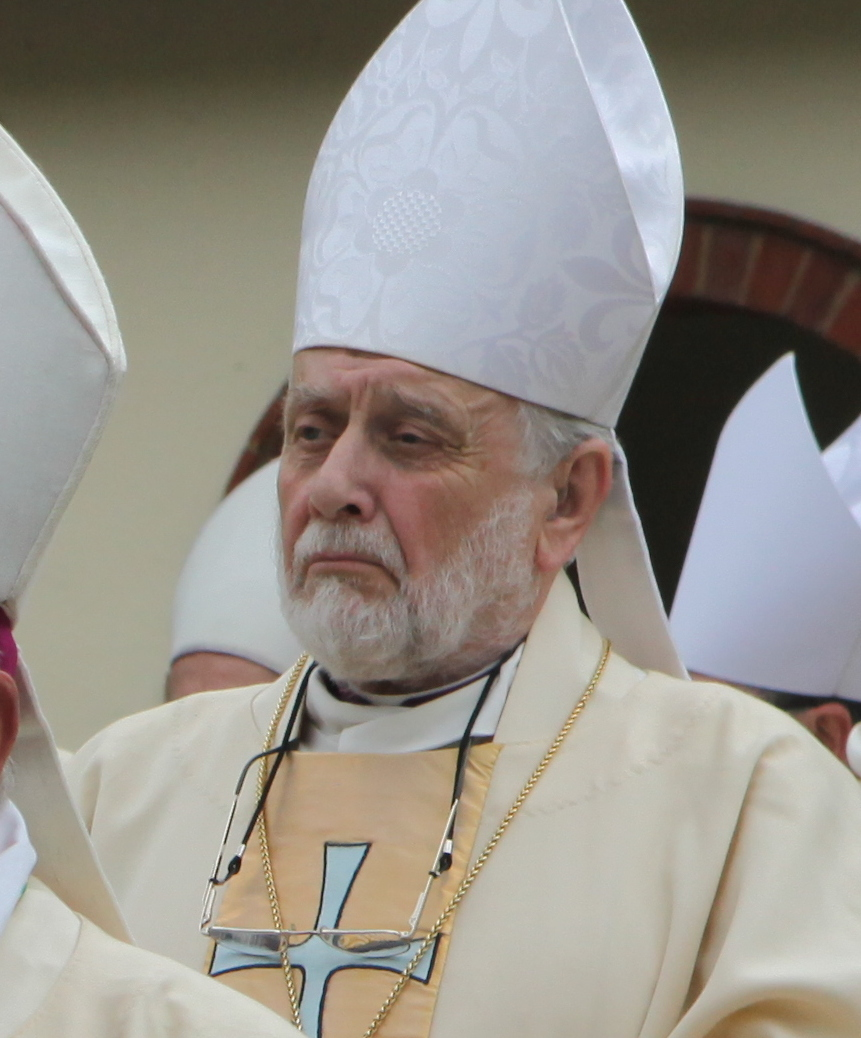
- Silk in 2009
- Church: Roman Catholic Church
- See: Personal Ordinariate of Our Lady of Walsingham
- Other post: Anglican Bishop of Ballarat (1994–2003)

Orders
- Ordination: 1960 (Anglican priest); 2011 (Catholic priest)
- Consecration: 23 February 1994 (Anglican bishop) by George Carey

Personal details
- Born: 23 August 1936
- Died: 20 September 2023 (aged 87)
- Denomination: Roman Catholicism
- Spouse: Joyce (m. 1957)
- Children: 2
- Education: St Stephen's House, Oxford

Robert David Silk (23 August 1936 – 20 September 2023) was an English priest of the Roman Catholic Church. He was formerly an Anglican bishop and was the Bishop of Ballarat in the Anglican Church of Australia.

== Early life and education ==
Silk was born on 23 August 1936. He was educated at Gillingham Grammar School, Exeter University and St Stephen's House, Oxford.

== Ordained ministry ==
=== Anglican ministry ===
Silk was ordained in the Church of England: made a deacon during Advent 1959 (20 December) by Robert Stannard, Dean of Rochester (and assistant bishop), at Rochester Cathedral, and ordained a priest the following Advent (18 December 1960), by Russell White, Bishop of Tonbridge, at Bexley (St Mary's) Parish Church. His first positions were curacies at St Barnabas' Gillingham and Holy Redeemer, Lamorbey. He then became the priest in charge of the Church of the Good Shepherd, Blackfen followed by incumbencies at Swanscombe and St George's Church, Beckenham (1975 to 1980). He was then appointed the Archdeacon of Leicester.

Silk was consecrated a bishop on 23 February 1994, by George Carey, Archbishop of Canterbury, at Westminster Abbey, and moved to Australia where he became the eighth bishop of the rural Diocese of Ballarat. On his return to England from Australia in 2003 he served for eighteen months as full-time parish priest of St Michael's, Amberley (with North Stoke, Parham, Wiggonholt, and Greatham) in Sussex, before retiring to Devon where he was an honorary assistant bishop in the Diocese of Exeter.

=== Roman Catholic ministry ===
Silk was received into the Roman Catholic Church in 2011. He was ordained to the diaconate in that church on 15 February 2011 and the priesthood on 18 February 2011. In June 2012, he was elevated to the rank of monsignor as a Chaplain of His Holiness.

== Personal life and death ==
In 1957, Silk married Joyce Silk. She predeceased her husband. They had two children, a son and a daughter.

Silk died at a Torquay hospital on 20 September 2023 following a fall the previous day. He was 87.
