= Fleetwood High School =

Location
- Broadway; Fleetwood; Lancashire, FY7 8HE; England; 53.90973°N 3.03716°W

Information
- Type: Foundation school
- Motto: Achievement for all through personal best
- Established: 1977
- Local authority: Lancashire
- Department for Education URN: 119771 Tables
- Ofsted: Reports
- Headteacher: Chris Wardle
- Gender: Coeducational
- Age: 11 to 16
- Enrolment: 979 as of January 2023
- Website: http://www.fleetwoodhs.org.uk/

Fleetwood High School is a coeducational secondary school located in Fleetwood in the English county of Lancashire.

The school was founded in 1977 as a comprehensive non-denominational school, a successor to Fleetwood Grammar School (1921–77) and Bailey School. It was renamed Fleetwood Sports College in 2005 when the school was given specialist school status in sport, but reverted to its original name in September 2010. Today it is a foundation school administered by Lancashire County Council and the Fleetwood Education Trust.

Fleetwood High School admits pupils from the Fylde Coast, predominantly Fleetwood, Thornton and Cleveleys. Main feeder primary schools include Charles Saer Primary School, Chaucer Primary School, Flakefleet Primary School, Larkholme Primary School and Shakespeare Primary School. Fleetwood High School offers GCSEs and BTECs as programmes of study for pupils. The school also offers some vocational courses in conjunction with Blackpool and The Fylde College.

== Notable former pupils ==
=== Fleetwood Grammar School ===
- David Binns CBE, General Manager from 1969-89 of Warrington and Runcorn Development Corporation
- Rebecca Bunting, Vice-Chancellor from 2020 of the University of Bedfordshire, and from 2015-20 of Buckinghamshire New University, Dean of Education from 1998-2002 at Anglia Polytechnic University
- Caroline Rookes CBE, Chairman of the Pensions Ombudsman, former Chief Executive until 2017 of the Money Advice Service, Director: Savings, Pensions, Share Schemes from 2002-05 at the Inland Revenue

=== Fleetwood High School ===
- Ven Simon Burton-Jones, Bishop of Tonbridge since 2018, Archdeacon of Rochester from 2010-2018
