= Howard Riddle =

British judge

Senior District Judge (Chief Magistrate) for England and Wales
- In office 2010–2016
- Appointed by: Elizabeth II
- Preceded by: Timothy Workman, CBE
- Succeeded by: Emma Arbuthnot

District Judge (Magistrates' Court)
- In office 1995–2016
- Appointed by: Elizabeth II

Personal details
- Born: Howard Charles Fraser Riddle; 13 August 1947 (age 78)
- Spouse: Susan Hilary Hurst
- Children: 2 daughters
- Education: Judd School, Tonbridge
- Alma mater: London School of Economics, College of Law.
- Occupation: Retired
- Profession: Solicitor
- Awards: CBE 2018

Howard Charles Fraser Riddle (born 13 August 1947). is a retired British judge who was the Senior District Judge (Chief Magistrate) for England and Wales. He was appointed to that office in 2010.

== Early life and education ==
Riddle was educated at Bexley Grammar School; The Judd School, Tonbridge in Kent; the London School of Economics and the College of Law, Lancaster Gate. He was Admitted to the Roll of Solicitors in 1978.

== Career ==
1969–70 - Sub-Editor, Penguin Books;

1970–71 - Editor, McGill-Queens University Press;

1971–76 - Publications Officer, Social Sciences and Humanities Research Council, Canada;

1976–95 - Solicitor, Edward Fail, Bradshaw and Waterson, (Senior Partner, 1985–95);

1993–95 - Vice-Chairman, London Area Committee, Legal Aid Board;

2004–10 - Member, Sentencing Advisory Panel, (Vice-Chairman, 2007–10);

2008–11 - Chairman, Legal Committee, Council of District Judges (Magistrates' Courts);

2012–17 - Member, Editorial Board: Blackstone's Criminal Practice;

2012–17 - Member, Editorial Board: Criminal Law Review, now Honorary Member.

=== Judicial career ===
Riddle was appointed a Metropolitan Stipendiary Magistrate in 1995, automatically becoming a District Judge (Magistrates' Courts) upon the renaming of that role. He was appointed Senior District Judge for England and Wales (Chief Magistrate) in 2010.

He was a contributing editor to Wilkinson's Road Traffic Offences between 2008–12 and contributed to Blackstone's Criminal Practice between 2011-12.

=== High profile cases ===
District Judge Riddle (as he then was) presided over a high-profile extradition cases, including:

- Julian Assange wanted in Sweden on allegations of sexual assaults, including rape,
- Shrien Dewani wanted in South Africa for the alleged murder of his wife on their honeymoon (he was sent to South Africa and acquitted).
- Domenico Rancadore who had been convicted in Italy in absence of mafia-related offences (the warrant was later withdrawn).
- Davit Kezerashvili the former defence minister of Georgia wanted for prosecution for financial offences (extradition was refused).

He also tried and/or sentenced high-profile criminal cases, including an unsuccessful private prosecution against Thomas Monson, the president of the Church of Jesus Christ of Latter-day Saints for fraud.

In March 2011 he was criticised by some for convicting a man who had burned a poppy in a demonstration during the two-minute silence on Armistice Day (it being said by critics that this breached the right to freedom of expression), and more widely criticised for imposing too lenient a fine after conviction.

In 2015 Riddle issued search warrants for premises connected to three distinguished and entirely innocent men. The allegations against them were made by a man known at the time as “Nick” but later identified as Carl Beech. In 2019 Beech was convicted of perjury for these false allegations, and sentenced to a lengthy term of imprisonment. A report by Sir Richard Henriques, a former High Court judge commissioned by the Metropolitan Police Commissioner, concluded that the judge was correct to issue the warrants on the basis of the information provided to him, but would not have done so had the information provided to him by the police not been misleading.

== Honourable appointments ==
He was appointed an Honorary Bencher of Gray’s Inn in 2012.

Riddle was awarded a CBE in the 2018 New Year Honours List.

Legal offices
Preceded by Timothy Workman, CBE	Senior District Judge; 2010 - 2016	Succeeded by Emma Arbuthnot
