= Brian Castle =

Church of England bishop (born 1949)

The Right Reverend Brian Castle
- Bishop of Tonbridge
- Diocese: Rochester
- In office: 2002–2015
- Predecessor: Brian Smith
- Successor: vacant; then Simon Burton-Jones (ann.)

Orders
- Ordination: 1977
- Consecration: 24 January 2002 by George Carey

Personal details
- Born: 7 September 1949 (age 77)
- Denomination: Anglican
- Spouse: Jane
- Children: 3
- Profession: Theologian; formerly social worker
- Education: University College London

Brian Colin Castle (born 7 September 1949) is a retired bishop in the Church of England, formerly the Bishop of Tonbridge. He retired from that See on 31 October 2015.

Castle was educated at Wilson's School and University College London. He was ordained in 1978 after studying at Cuddesdon. He began his ordained ministry as a curate at St Nicholas' Sutton and was then successively priest in charge at Solwezi, Zambia, Vicar of Northmore Green, Somerset and Director of Pastoral Studies at Ripon College Cuddesdon before his ordination to the episcopate. He was consecrated a bishop by George Carey, Archbishop of Canterbury, on 24 January 2002 at Rochester Cathedral, and installed there in the same service. In 1989 he was awarded a PhD in theology from the University of Birmingham. He is married to Jane, with whom he has three children.

== Styles ==
- Brian Castle (1949–1978)
- The Reverend Brian Castle (1978–1989)
- The Reverend Doctor Brian Castle (1989–2002)
- The Right Reverend Doctor Brian Castle (2002–present)

Church of England titles
Preceded by Brian Smith	Bishop of Tonbridge; 2002–2015	Vacant Title next held by Simon Burton-Jones (bishop-designate)
