= Andy Wooding Jones =

British Anglican priest (born 1961)

Andrew David Wooding Jones (born 17 August 1961) is a British Anglican priest who served as Archdeacon of Rochester, 2018–2024.

== Early life ==
Wooding Jones was born on 17 August 1961 in Manchester. His parents are Gerald and Joan Wooding Jones. He was educated at The Skinners' School and received his HND in Hotel and Catering Administration from Huddersfield Polytechnic. In 1991, he was awarded a BA in Theology and Pastoral Studies from Oak Hill College and in 2001, he received an MBA in Church and Charity Management from the University of Hull.

== Career ==
He was ordained deacon in 1991, and priest 1992. After a curacy in Welling, he was Team Vicar of St Thomas’, Crookes from 1995 to 2000. He was Resident Director of the Ashburnham Christian Trust from 2000 to 2012. He held administrative positions with The World Prayer Centre, Birmingham, Incognito Sussex and Lee Abbey before his appointment as Archdeacon. He resigned his archdeaconry on or around 14 September 2024.

Church of England titles
Preceded by Simon Burton-Jones	Archdeacon of Rochester; 2018–2024	Succeeded by Sandra McCalla
