= Timothy Workman =

British judge

Senior District Judge (Chief Magistrate) for England and Wales
- In office 2003–2010
- Appointed by: Elizabeth II
- Preceded by: Penelope Hewitt, CBE
- Succeeded by: Howard Riddle, CBE

District Judge (Magistrates' Court)
- In office 1986–2010
- Appointed by: Elizabeth II

Personal details
- Occupation: Retired
- Awards: CBE 2007

Senior District Judge Timothy Henry Workman CBE is a retired British judge, a long-term stipendiary magistrate who served as Senior District Judge (Chief Magistrate) for England and Wales.

From 1967 to 1969, Workman was a probation officer in the Inner London district, before working as a solicitor until 1986, when he was appointed to serve as a Stipendiary Magistrate for the metropolitan district of London. When, in 2000, the Provincial and Metropolitan Stipendiary Benches merged, Workman was made Deputy Senior District Judge. In February 2003, following the retirement of Mrs. Penelope Hewitt (CBE), Workman was appointed by the Lord Chancellor as the Senior District Judge and Chief Magistrate for the London District Bench in the Magistrates Court, and was replaced in his rôle of Deputy Senior District Judge by Daphne Wickham a few months later.

As Chief Magistrate, Mr. Workman chose to sit almost exclusively at the historic Bow Street Magistrates' Court, where he handled the vast majority of all extradition and terrorism cases which passed through his jurisdiction, until that Court was closed. He then sat at the City of Westminster Magistrates' Court (following the renaming of Horseferry Road Magistrates' Court).

Mr. Workman served on the Inner London Probation Committee from 1990, and on the Committee of Magistrates for London (later the Inner London Magistrates' Courts Committee) from 1995, both until 2000. He currently serves on the Sentencing Guidelines Council, the Council of the Magistrates' Association, and the Lord Chancellor's Advisory Committee for Inner London.

Timothy Workman may have been the target of an assassination attempt by the Russian secret services in 2004 due to his having previously rejected two Russian extradition requests; one for Akhmed Zakayev, the Chechen leader in London, due to a "substantial risk" of torture or death, and another for wealthy Russian expatriate Boris Berezovsky. The Kremlin had accused Workman of playing "Cold War politics" after he rejected Zakayev's extradition requests. On 7 January 2004, Robert Workman, an 83-year-old retired Lieutenant Colonel who lived in Furneux Pelham in Hertfordshire, not far from Judge Workman's home, was killed on his doorstep by a shotgun blast. News reports indicated that Robert Workman's murder may have been a case of mistaken identity, and that Timothy Workman was the real target. However, police believed that the evidence pointed to the involvement of someone who lives or lived locally. Years later, Christopher Doherty Puncheon, Robert Workman's gardener, was convicted of his murder. One critical piece of evidence that lead to his confession to a cellmate, in which he claimed he had been paid to kill Workman.

In September 2005, Workman issued an unprecedented arrest warrant for a retired Israeli Army officer, Major General Doron Almog, based on statements of a Palestinian group about actions in the Gaza Strip. The warrant was issued on suspicion of committing a breach of the Fourth Geneva Convention (1949) by the unjustified destruction of almost 60 refugee houses in 2002. Almog, who was flying to the UK on an El Al flight, stayed on the aircraft instead of getting off at London and being arrested by waiting Metropolitan Police officers from the UK's Anti-Terrorist and War Crimes Unit. Police did not board the plane and attempt to execute the warrant due to fears of an armed confrontation with El Al sky marshals and Almog's personal bodyguards, and the plane was allowed to return to Israel. Shortly afterward, the warrant was cancelled and the British government apologized to Israel over the affair.

Legal offices
Preceded by Penelope Hewitt, CBE	Senior District Judge; 2003 - 2010	Succeeded by Howard Riddle, CBE
