= Mr Bingo =

British illustrator, artist

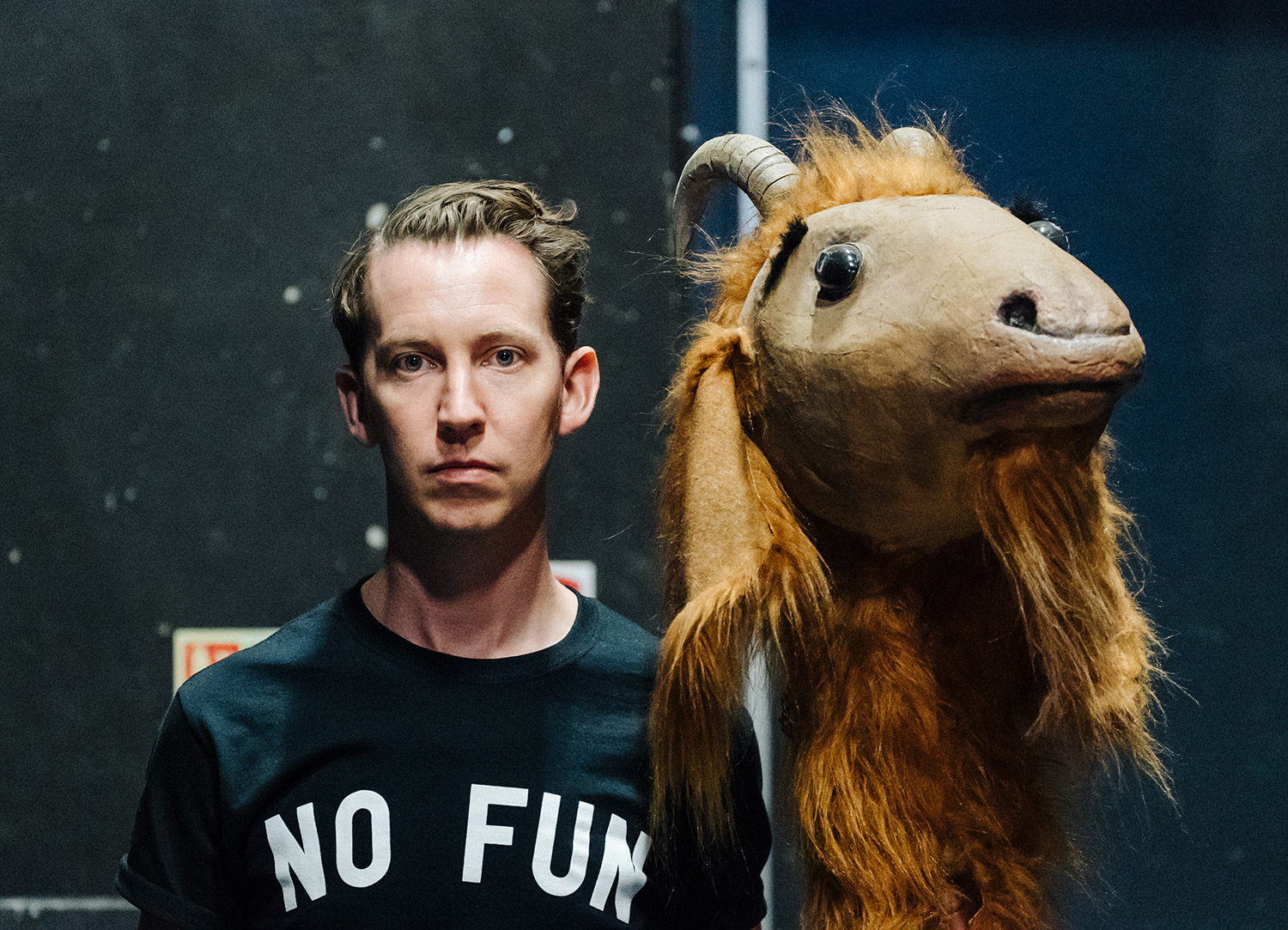
- Mr Bingo by Dan Rubin
- Born: Geoff Hand; 1979 (age 46–47); Kent
- Education: Kent Institute of Art & Design; Bath Spa University
- Known for: Hate Mail
- Style: Illustration
- Website: mr.bingo

Mr Bingo (Geoff Hand; born 1979, Kent) is an illustrator, artist and speaker living and working in London, UK.

== Biography ==
Mr Bingo grew up in Leigh, Kent and attended The Judd School in Tonbridge. In 1998 he studied a foundation course at the Kent Institute of Art & Design in Maidstone and it was during this year that he played Bingo at Gala Bingo in Maidstone winning £141 earning him the nickname ‘Bingo’. He went on to study graphic design at Bath Spa University College and specialised in illustration. He graduated in 2001 and moved to London.

== Work ==
Mr Bingo has worked as an illustrator since 2001 working for a large number of commercial clients across a broad range of media including editorial, advertising, branding, clothing, book covers, walls, packaging and television.

Among his many clients have been such big-name organisations as Oxfam, Orange, Microsoft, Nike, the BBC, Volkswagen, Virgin, The TATE, The Mighty Boosh, The Amy Winehouse Foundation, Jimmy Carr, Channel 4, Converse, Howies, Carhartt, Absolut and MTV. He has created editorial illustrations and other work for The Financial Times, The Washington Post, The Guardian and The New York Times newspapers, and has had work featured in magazines as diverse as The New Yorker, TIME, Bearded, Dazed and Confused, WIRED, Esquire and GQ.

In 2006 and 2007, he provided the covers for the two QI books based on the comedy panel quiz fronted by Stephen Fry. The Book of General Ignorance and The Book of Animal Ignorance are both published by Faber and Faber. A selection of rough artwork and preliminary designs have since been showcased by the QI website.

Mr Bingo and his work has been featured in a wide range of magazines including Creative Review and Icon. He was recently described by Caroline Roberts in Vroom Magazine as ‘a person who has redefined the traditional job description of an illustrator’.

Alongside his commissioned work, Mr Bingo has regularly created limited edition prints which are represented by the Nelly Duff Gallery in London. Notable among these prints were the Hair Portrait series from 2007 where he depicted famous groups of people such as characters from Star Wars, The Mighty Boosh and Guns N' Roses, by drawing only their hair.

After consistently being asked to work for free and tiring of it, in 2011 Mr Bingo put a section on his website called Does Mr Bingo work for free?. The piece was so popular, it was turned into a limited edition print by Intern Magazine and was also read out in its entirety on air by Chris Moyles on his Radio X show in 2015.

== Hate Mail ==
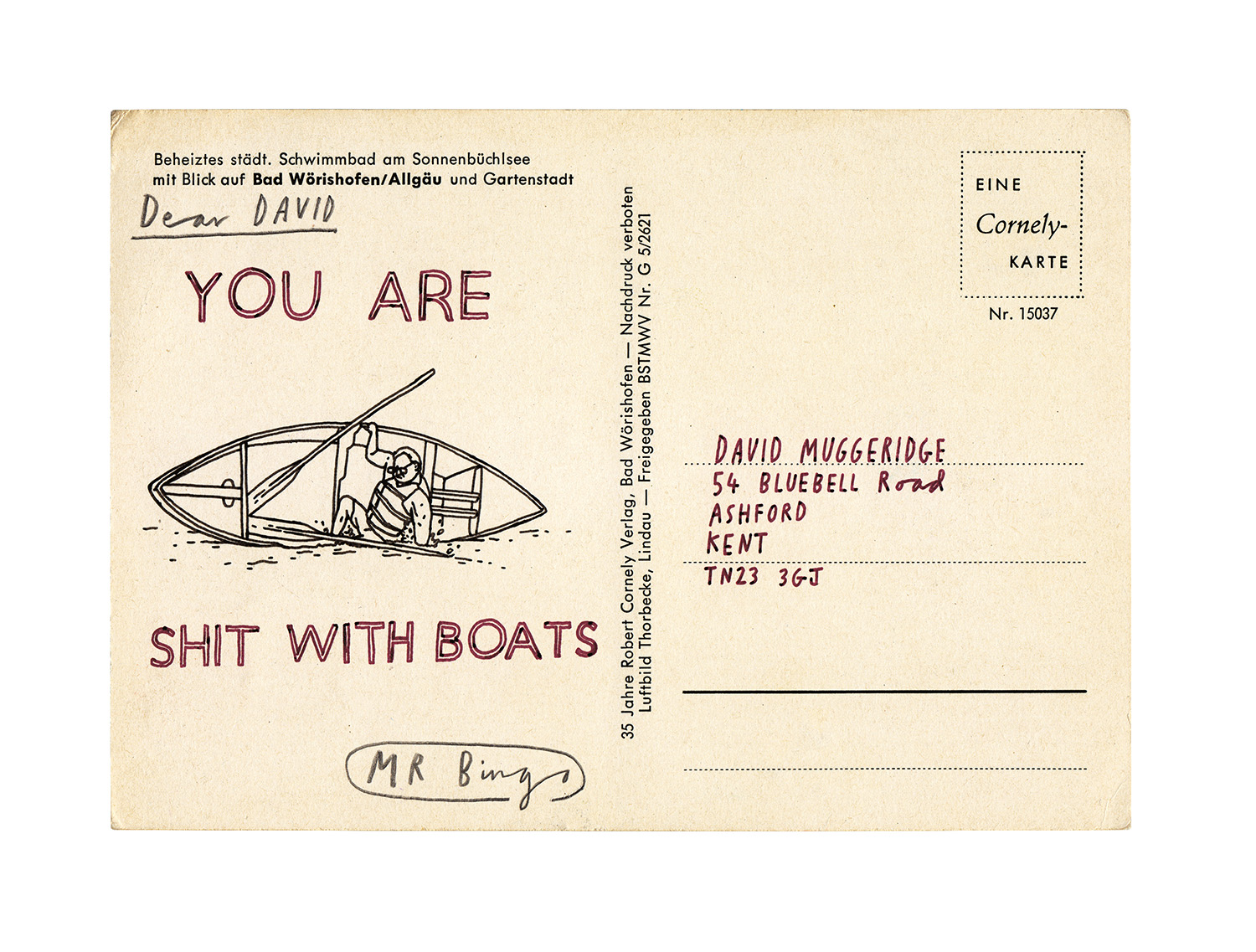
Hate Mail Postcard by Mr Bingo

Mr Bingo is best known for his Hate Mail project which he began in 2011. The project, which involves sending offensive postcards to strangers, started as a 'drunk idea’ but was then exhibited in galleries and led to two books. In 2012, Camden Town Brewery released a limited edition Hate Ale beer with Mr Bingo called Camden Town Is Full Of Cunts. 5000 bottles were produced.

In the summer of 2015 Mr Bingo ran a Kickstarter campaign to fund a high-end art book of his Hate Mail illustrations. The campaign, which was launched with a rap video for which Mr Bingo wrote and recorded an original song, was set to run for 28 days but was successfully funded within 9 hours and finished 386% funded with 3,732 backers, becoming the most successful ever Kickstarter campaign for a book in the UK.

== Speaking ==
Mr Bingo has appeared at events including The Lost Lectures, FITC, OFFSET, Pictoplasma, Vice, OFFF, Reasons To Be Creative, The Economist Big Rethink, BBC Worldwide Creative Summit, Bookslam, D&AD Presidents Lectures, Guardian Masterclasses, TYPO Berlin and Latitude Festival.
