= David Bartleet =

British Anglican bishop (1929–2002)

- Bishop of Tonbridge
- Diocese: Rochester
- In office: 1982–1993
- Predecessor: Philip Goodrich
- Successor: Brian Smith

Orders
- Ordination: 1957
- Consecration: 1982

Personal details
- Born: 11 April 1929
- Died: 1 November 2002 (aged 73)
- Denomination: Anglican
- Parents: Edmund Arthur Bartleet, Helen née Holford
- Spouse: Jean Mary née Rees
- Children: 3
- Education: St Peter's Hall

David Henry Bartleet (11 April 1929 – 1 November 2002) was a British Church of England bishop. From 1982 to 1993, he was the fourth Bishop of Tonbridge, a suffragan bishop in the Diocese of Rochester.

Bartleet was educated at St Edward's School, Oxford, and St Peter's Hall. He studied for ordination at Westcott House, Cambridge. He began his ordained ministry as a curate at St Mary-le-Tower, Ipswich. He was made deacon at Michaelmas 1957 at St Edmundsbury Cathedral and ordained priest the following Michaelmas (1958) at All Saints' Church, Ipswich — both times by Arthur Morris, Bishop of St Edmundsbury and Ipswich. He undertook a second curacy as curate-in-charge of St Edmund's Church in the parish of St George's, Doncaster (1960–1964). He was then vicar of Edenbridge (until 1973) and then of Bromley before being appointed to the episcopate; at Bromley he was additionally appointed an honorary canon of Rochester Cathedral from 1979 (which honour he kept alongside his suffragan see). He was appointed to serve as Bishop suffragan of Tonbridge; he served until he retired in 1993. He was consecrated a bishop on 23 October 1982 by Robert Runcie, Archbishop of Canterbury, at Canterbury Cathedral.

Bartleet was the son of Edmund Arthur Bartleet and Helen (née Holford). In 1956, he married Jean Mary née Rees; they had one son and two daughters.

== Notes ==
Church of England titles
Preceded by Philip Goodrich	Bishop of Tonbridge; 1982–1993	Succeeded by Brian Smith
