= Tonbridge Grammar School =

Location
- Deakin Leas; Tonbridge, Kent, TN9 2JR; England; 51.1846°N 0.2745°E

Information
- Type: Grammar school Academy
- Motto: Courage and Honour
- Established: 1905
- Department for Education URN: 136417 Tables
- Ofsted: Reports
- Headteacher: Rebecca Crean
- Gender: Girls (Coeducational sixth form)
- Age: 11 to 18
- Houses: Arnold; Fayerman; Carey; Mitchener; Debney; Taylor
- Colours: Pantone 349 C, Pantone 1807 C,
- Publication: Scripted Magazine
- Website: http://www.tgs.kent.sch.uk/

Tonbridge Grammar School is a state grammar school in Tonbridge, Kent, United Kingdom. The school was established in 1905 at the Technical Institute in Avebury Avenue Tonbridge, having only 19 enrolled students. The school is situated in the south of Tonbridge and has approximately 1,050 students, ranging from 11 to 18 years.

Previously known as Tonbridge Grammar School for Girls, with the introduction of boys in the sixth form in 2002, the school changed its name. Tonbridge Grammar School has served 22 years as an International Baccalaureate World School, and in 2014 was announced as the best International Baccalaureate state school in the United Kingdom for the sixth consecutive year.

== History ==
=== Early years: 1905-1913 ===
Tonbridge Grammar School for Girls opened on 24 January 1905 in the Technical Institute in Avebury Avenue Tonbridge with just 19 girls as pupils on the top floor of Tonbridge Library. The headmistress and only teacher was Miss Taylor who introduced the school motto, Courage and Honour. The school moved to its current site in Deakin Leas in 1913, after Tonbridge Library became too small to accommodate the growing numbers.

=== Middle years: 1919-1974 ===
The Education Act 1944 made the County School into the County Grammar School for Girls for pupils who passed the new Eleven Plus exam. Later, in 1957, the school hall, science block, gymnasium, Head teacher's office and school office were added. In 1963, the school swimming pool was opened and later in 1967, the library wing and music blocks were built.

In 1974, the Hillview annexe was built, and was later named after former head mistress Miss Mitchener; The Mitchener Hall.

=== 2000-2010 ===
In the year 2000, the Matthews Centre, more commonly known as the "Tech block" was dedicated to the memory of Gary Matthews, Vice Chair of Governors 1993 to 1999. In 2007 and 2008 an ambitious fundraising campaign financed a brand new school building that replaced many temporary buildings on the campus and that financed the redevelopment of the original School on the Hilltop. The Hands Building opened in late 2009.

=== 2010-present ===
2015 saw the addition of a new Sixth Form block in the place of the swimming pool and changing facilities, with the increased intake of pupils in the Sixth Form. It brought additional facilities and a modern design which earned it its name, the IBarn.

== Academic performance ==
The school has achieved high results in both International Baccalaureate and GCSE exams, ranking usually within the top state schools in the county. The local boys equivalent school, The Judd School similarly achieves good A-Level and GCSE results, making the pair the most high-achieving schools in south-west Kent. TGS has the Maths & Computing Specialist Status and Languages Specialist Status, as well as being a Leading Edge School.

As of 2012, the school has been running exclusively International Baccalaureate Diploma curriculum for Sixth Form students. Tonbridge Grammar School has been the top International Baccalaureate state school in the UK 2009, 2010, 2011 and 2012. In 2014 the Sunday Times named Tonbridge Grammar School, State Secondary School of the Year and International Baccalaureate (IB) School of the Year.

In 2026, the school shifted to a standard A level sixth form due to the removal of government funding for the IB.

== Notable former pupils ==
- Victoria Hislop, author
- Angie Sage, author, Septimus Heap series
- Margaret Sharp, Baroness Sharp of Guildford (née Hailstone), former SDP politician
- Rebecca Stephens, first British woman to climb Everest and the Seven Summits.
- Lynn Wallis Artistic Director of the Royal Academy of Dance since 1994.
- Dame Andrea Leadsom, Member of Parliament for South Northamptonshire 2010-2024, Secretary of State for Business, Energy and Industrial Strategy 2019-2020, Leader of the House of Commons 2017–2019, Economic Secretary to the Treasury 2014-2015.
- Cathy Gilliat-Smith, England hockey player
- Felicity Aston, explorer and climate scientist
- Jess Search, documentary producer

== See also ==
- Weald of Kent Grammar School
- The Judd School
- Tunbridge Wells Girls' Grammar School
