= Simon Burton-Jones =

British Anglican bishop

The Right Reverend Simon Burton-Jones
- Bishop of Tonbridge
- Church: Church of England
- Diocese: Diocese of Rochester
- In office: 2018–present
- Predecessor: vacant
- Other post: Archdeacon of Rochester (2010–2018)

Orders
- Ordination: 1993 (deacon); 1994 (priest)
- Consecration: 3 July 2018 by Justin Welby

Personal details
- Born: Simon David Jones; 23 December 1962 (age 63) Fleetwood, Lancashire, England
- Denomination: Anglican
- Spouse: Julia (m. 1989)
- Children: two
- Education: Fleetwood High School
- Alma mater: Emmanuel College, Cambridge; St John's College, Nottingham

Simon David Burton-Jones (né Jones; born 23 December 1962) is a British Anglican bishop. He has been the bishop of Tonbridge, the suffragan bishop of the Diocese of Rochester, since his consecration on 3 July 2018; he was previously the archdeacon of Rochester.

== Early life and education ==
He was born on 23 December 1962 in Fleetwood, Lancashire to Harry and Dorothy Jones. He was educated at Fleetwood High School, a comprehensive school in Fleetwood. He studied law at Emmanuel College, Cambridge, graduating with a Bachelor of Arts (BA) degree in 1984: as per tradition, his BA was promoted to a Master of Arts (MA Cantab). From 1987 to 1990, he worked at the Jubilee Centre, a Christian think tank. He trained for ordained ministry and studied theology at St John's College, Nottingham, an open evangelical Anglican theological college. He graduated with a Bachelor of Theology (BTh) degree in 1992 and a Master of Arts (MA) degree in 1993.

== Ordained ministry ==
Burton-Jones was ordained in the Church of England as a deacon in 1993 and as a priest in 1994. From 1993 to 1996, he served his curacy at St Peter's Church, Darwen in the Diocese of Blackburn. He began his ministry in the Diocese of Rochester with a curacy at St Mark's Church, Biggin Hill between 1996 and 1998. After this, he was priest in charge (1998–2000) and then vicar (2000–2005) of St Mary's Church, Plaistow, Bromley. He was additionally Area Dean of Bromley between 2001 and 2006. From 2005 to 2010, he was rector of St Nicholas Church, Chislehurst. Since 2010, he has served as archdeacon of Rochester and been a canon residentiary of Rochester Cathedral.

On 27 March 2018, it was announced that Burton-Jones would be the next bishop of Tonbridge, the suffragan bishop of the Diocese of Rochester. He was consecrated a bishop on 3 July 2018 during a service in London.

== Personal life ==
In 1989, Simon Jones married Julia Burton. They have a son and a daughter.

Church of England titles
Preceded by Peter Lock	Archdeacon of Rochester; 2010–2018	Succeeded by Andy Wooding Jones
Vacant Title last held by Brian Castle	Bishop of Tonbridge; 2018–present	Incumbent
