= Tom Probert =

English cricketer (born 1986)

Personal information
- Full name: Thomas John William Probert
- Born: 26 September 1986 (age 40); Pembury, Kent, England
- Batting: Left-handed
- Bowling: Right-arm medium

Domestic team information
- Years: Team
- 2009–2013: Cambridge University
- 2011: Cambridgeshire

Career statistics
Competition	First-class
Matches	4
Runs scored	9
Batting average	4.50
100s/50s	–/–
Top score	4*
Balls bowled	765
Wickets	12
Bowling average	31.91
5 wickets in innings	–
10 wickets in match	–
Best bowling	4/20
Catches/stumpings	2/–
- Source: Cricinfo, 21 July 2019

Thomas John William Probert (born 26 September 1986) is an English former first-class cricketer.

Probert was born at Pembury in September 1986. He was educated at The Judd School, before going up to Peterhouse, Cambridge. While studying at Cambridge, he made four appearances in first-class cricket for Cambridge University between 2009 and 2013, each against Oxford University in the University Match. A right-arm medium pace bowler, he took 12 wickets at an average of 31.91 in his four appearances, with best figures of 4 for 20. In addition to playing first-class cricket, Probert also played minor counties cricket for Cambridgeshire in 2011, making a single appearance in the MCCA Knockout Trophy.
