= David Moule-Evans =

English composer, conductor and academic

David Moule-Evans (21 November 1905 – 18 May 1988) was an English composer, conductor and academic.

== Life ==
Moule-Evans was born in Ashford, Kent, and was educated at the Judd School in Tonbridge before studying at the Royal College of Music in London with Malcolm Sargent and Herbert Howells. While at the Royal College he became friendly with his contemporary Michael Tippett, beating him to gain the Mendelssohn Scholarship in 1928 and continuing studies at Queen's College, Oxford. Tippett asked him to conduct the first full concert of his own music at the Barn Theatre in Oxted on 5 April 1930. From 1945 to 1974 Moule-Evans returned to the RCM to teach harmony, counterpoint and composition.

He married Monica Warden Evans in March 1935 and the couple lived at Claremont, 10 Rose Hill, Dorking in Surrey. They later moved to Merry Down, Harrow Road West, Dorking. Illness cut short his composing career from 1968, although he continued to teach until his death in 1988. His archive and manuscripts are housed in the National Library of Wales.

== Music ==
As a composer Moule-Evans has been largely forgotten today, but during his lifetime he achieved a measure of success. His Concerto for String Orchestra won the Carnegie British Music award in 1928. The Dance Suite, scored for full orchestra with piano, five percussion players and timpani, was completed in December 1930 and received its first performance at a Royal College of Music Patrons' Fund Concert in March 1931. He was one of several composer contributors (alongside Ralph Vaughan Williams, William Cole, Julian Gardiner and John Tilehurst) to the 1938 Dorking pageant play England's Pleasant Land, written by E.M. Forster.

His Symphony in G (1944) was the controversial £1,000 prizewinner of the Australian International Jubilee Symphony Competition of 1951 with The Musical Times and others claiming that the runner up, a symphony by Robert Hughes, was "definitely superior". (Malcolm Sargent revived the work in the UK for a Royal Festival Hall performance by the London Symphony Orchestra in 1952, but to mixed reviews, the Musical Times dismissing it as "conventional, banal and boring").

The orchestral poem September Dusk was premiered at the BBC Proms on 25 August 1945. Moule-Evans mostly wrote in a popular, straightforward "light music" style, although the composer Michael Hurd has commented that his later chamber works, including the Violin Sonata in F-sharp minor (1956) and the Piano Sonata (1966) are more adventurous in style. The only music currently available in recorded form are the soundtracks to a series of British Council documentary films commissioned by Muir Mathieson, including Health of a Nation and London 1942.

== Selected works ==
Orchestral

- 1926 Rhapsody No 2
- 1928 Concerto for String Orchestra
- 1930 Dance Suite
- 1935 Cliff Castle, symphonic poem
- 1935 Polka for Cello and Orchestra (dedicated to cellist Maurice Hardy)
- 1938 Divertimento for strings (first performance, Bristol 1939 under Reginald Redman)
- 1942 The Spirit of London, overture
- 1943 September Dusk, symphonic poem
- 1944 Symphony in G Major (awarded 1st prize at the Australian Jubilee Competition)
- 1948 Vienna Rhapsody, waltz
- 1949 The Haunted Place, miniature for string orchestra
- 1951 Old Tupper's Dance
- 1952 Sussex Downs, suite for small orchestra

Choral and Vocal

- 1945 Two Celtic Songs, soprano and piano (text: Fiona Macleod) (published Stainer & Bell)
- 1947 Duncton Hill, unaccompanied part song for mixed choir (text: Hilaire Belloc) (published Joseph Williams)
- 1948 The Ploughboy in Luck, two part song
- 1949 Bed in Summer, Hayloft, The Swing, songs (text: R.L Stevenson)
- 1949 O Mistress Mine, two part song (published Stainer & Bell)
- 1951 My Own Country and Twelfth Night, songs for middle voice and piano (text: Hilaire Belloc)
- 1951 Twilight, song for middle voice and piano (text: John Masefield)

Chamber music

- 1925 Sonata in E major for violin and piano
- 1938 Moto perpetuo for viola and piano
- 1956 Sonata in F sharp minor for violin and piano
- 1966 Piano Sonata
- Trio for flute, oboe and piano (dedicated to The Sylvan Trio)

Film music

- 1942 London, 1942
- 1943 Health of a Nation
- 1945 Make Fruitful the Land
