= Bill Cockcroft =

Bill Cockcroft DL

Chief Scout Commissioner of England

William Cockcroft DL is the former Chief Scout Commissioner of England and was director of the 21st World Scout Jamboree.

Cockcroft was educated at The Judd School, leaving in 1965, and graduated from the Polytechnic of the South Bank in 1970, majoring in Quantity Surveying.

He is Senior Partner of Sawyer Fisher Chartered Quantity Surveyors, which he joined in June 1965.

In 2008, Cockcroft was awarded the Bronze Wolf, the only distinction of the World Organization of the Scout Movement, awarded by the World Scout Committee for exceptional services to world Scouting, at the 38th World Scout Conference.
