= Harold Hailstone =

British cartoonist and illustrator (1897–1982)

- Born: 14 July 1897; London
- Died: 21 November 1982; Hadlow
- Education: Goldsmiths College
- Occupations: Illustrator; cartoonist; war artist (1944–)
- Relatives: Bernard Hailstone

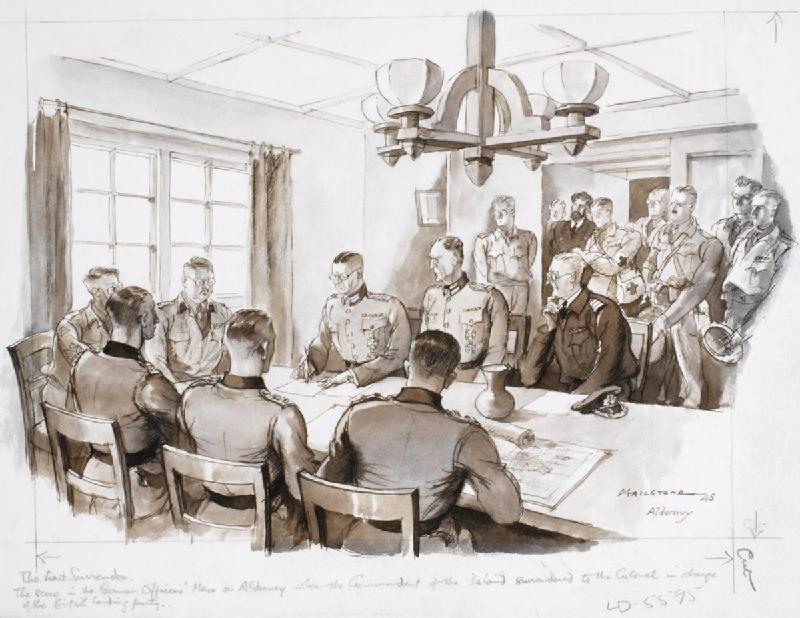
The Surrender - Hailstone's sketch of the German Commandant's surrender on Alderney in May 1945

Harold William Hailstone (14 July 1897 – 21 November 1982) was a British cartoonist and illustrator, who served as an official war artist.

He was born on 14 July 1897 in London, England. His father William Edward Hailstone was a dentist. He was educated at The Judd School. During World War I he served first in the army and then as a trainee pilot in the Royal Flying Corps. He subsequently attended Goldsmiths College alongside Graham Sutherland.

His work was published in journals including the Illustrated London News, Punch, The Sketch, Strand Magazine, and Tatler.

He returned to military service immediately before and during World War II, joining the Royal Air Force from 1938 to 1945, being a flight lieutenant from 1940, and was appointed a war artist in 1944.

After the war, he was a staff cartoonist for the Daily Mirror.

In retirement he lived at Corneys Cottage, Hadlow, Kent, where he died on 21 November 1982.

Some of his works are in the collection of the Imperial War Museum.

His younger brother was the portraitist Bernard Hailstone.

== Books illustrated by Hailstone ==
- Chen, Peh Der (1932). Honourable and Peculiar Ways. London: Hamish Hamilton.
- Halsey, Margaret (1938). With Malice Towards Some. London: Hamish Hamilton.
- Russell, Steven (1947). Bulldozer Brown. Oxford: Oxford University Press.
- Stone, Michael (1947). The Master of Magic. London: Peter Lunn.
- Bell, Neil (1954). Many Waters. London: Eyre & Spottiswoode. (dust jacket)
- Maddock, Llywelyn W. (1965). West Country Folk Tales. James Brodie.
