= Timothy Allen =

English photographer and filmmaker

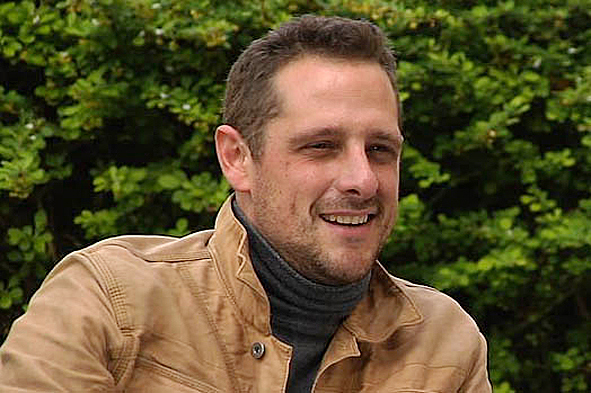
- Born: 26 May 1971 (age 55); Tonbridge, Kent, England
- Education: University of Leeds
- Occupations: Photographer, director
- Known for: Human Planet Epic Animal Journeys
- Website: www.humanplanet.com

Timothy Allen (born 1971) is an English photographer and filmmaker best known for his work with indigenous people and isolated communities around the world.

== Early life ==
Timothy Allen was born in Tonbridge, Kent, England, the second son of two school teachers. He attended The Judd School and took further education at Leeds University where he received a BSc in Zoology. Whilst at university, Allen undertook a three-month ecological research project in remote jungle on the Indonesian Island of Sulawesi during which an encounter with a reclusive forest dwelling tribe proved to be a pivotal point in his life. Subsequently, after graduating from university he returned to Indonesia where he spent a further 3 years travelling and studying. It was during this time that he discovered his passion for photography. At the age of 27 he began a part-time diploma in photography in Hereford and for his first year project he joined an aid convoy to Mostar during the town's struggle to rebuild itself after the Yugoslav Wars.

== Career ==
After returning from Bosnia, Allen was offered his first job as a freelance photographer working at The Sunday Telegraph in London. A year later, after commissions from all of the British broadsheet publications, he eventually settled into a six-year position at The Independent.

A member of Axiom Photographic Agency from 2002 to 2011 his more recent work has revolved around indigenous peoples. It was a personal project in Bhutan, India and Nepal designed to escape the "rat race back home" that lead the BBC to commission him as part of the Human Planet team. In 2012 Allen signed with the International film production company Great Guns who currently represent him worldwide.

In 2017 Allen was the subject of a documentary on Animal Planet titled Epic Animal Journeys in which a film crew followed him on a midwinter nomadic migration across the Yamal Peninsula in Siberia with a Nenets family.

In 2019 Allen was on the winning team of notable alumni from the University of Leeds who won the Christmas edition of the BBC's Christmas University Challenge programme, alongside Henry Gee and Jonathan Clements, and captained by Richard Coles. They were the first non-Oxbridge team ever achieve first place in the tournament.

Allen owns a production company and is also the host of his own podcast.

== Human Planet ==
In 2008, the BBC commissioned Allen to work on the documentary project Human Planet. This was the first time that the BBC had employed a dedicated photographer on a landmark series. He spent over a year and a half travelling with 4 teams, covering stories of human endeavour in over forty countries around the world. Using the newly released first generation of DSLR cameras with HD video capabilities, Allen shot content for the programme and its accompanying multimedia projects as well as imagery that was published in a best-selling BBC book, formed an exhibition and was used in the program's worldwide branding and publicity.

He wrote a weekly blog for BBC Earth, documenting his work during Human Planet.

== Timothy Allen Photography Scholarship Award ==
In 2016 Allen created a photography scholarship award in conjunction with the Sharjah Government Media Bureau. Each year the scholarship is awarded to 5 photographers from around the world and includes a 10-day trip to the United Arab Emirates to work alongside Allen.

== Awards ==
- One time overall winner in Travel Photographer of the Year
- Six times category winner in Travel Photographer of the Year
- Five times runner up in Travel Photographer of the Year
- The Pangea Award of Excellence at SIPA 2016
- Press Photographer's Year Award
- Arts Photographer of the Year
- Twice nominated Photographer of the Year at the British Press Awards
- 'Human Planet' has won a host of awards including two BAFTAs and an Emmy Award as well as the ITB's Cultural Book Prize
