= David Halsey =

Anglican bishop (1919–2009)

Henry David Halsey (27 January 1919 – 16 May 2009) was an Anglican bishop. During his tenure, Bishop Halsey's focus was as a pastoral bishop, and the care of the clergy and their wives was his first priority. By supporting the clergy, he was able to support the people of the diocese. His home was a place of welcome and hospitality to innumerable groups in the diocese, but also a means of reaching out into the community. Representatives of the farming community, health and social services, the police, and many other groups all benefited from invitations to Rose. Many links were formed as a result, not only between Church and community, but within the different community groups.

== Life ==
Bishop Halsey was educated at King's College School, Wimbledon and King's College London. After this he took holy orders at Wells Theological College and was ordained in 1942 to a curacy at St. Peter's Church, Petersfield. He became a naval chaplain in the Royal Naval Volunteer Reserve where he met his wife Rachel, whom he married in 1947. He then served the Christian ministry successively in the West Country (Plymouth and Netheravon) and Kent (Chatham, Bromley and Tonbridge). He was Bishop of Carlisle from 1972 until his retirement in 1989. As well as taking a productive role within the diocese, he was also able to take on an active role in the House of Lords. Indeed, despite being from the most distant diocese, Bishop Halsey achieved one of the highest attendance rates of the Lords Spiritual at the time.

In retirement, David and Rachel moved to their home of many years on the Isle of Wight, which they also made a place of welcoming and loving hospitality. He and his wife Rachel had four daughters - Sarah, Jill, Jane and Mary. Rachel died in October 2013 in Cumbria.

Church of England titles
Preceded by Russell Berridge White	Bishop of Tonbridge; 1968 – 1972	Succeeded by Philip Harold Ernest Goodrich
Preceded by Sydney Cyril Bulley	Bishop of Carlisle; 1972 – 1989	Succeeded by Ian Harland
