= Richard Dixon (chemist) =

British chemist (1930–2021)

- Born: 15 December 1930; Borough Green, Kent, England
- Died: 25 May 2021 (aged 90)
- Occupation: Chemist

Richard Newland Dixon (25 December 1930—25 May 2021) FRS was a British chemist noted for his work in the field of thermal or optical properties of matter.

He was born in Borough Green, Kent the son of Robert T and Lilian Dixon He was educated at The Judd School, King's College London (BSc, 1951) and at St Catharine's College, Cambridge (PhD, 1955).

After obtaining his PhD, Dixon spent three years working as a postdoctoral researcher in Canada before becoming a lecturer at the University of Sheffield from 1960 to 1969.

From 1969, his career was based at the University of Bristol, starting as Chair of Theoretical Chemistry. He was elected Fellow of the Royal Society in 1986 and awarded the Rumford Medal in 2004.

== Personal life ==
He married Alison Birks in 1954.
