= Domenico Rancadore =

- Born: 1949 (age 76–77)
- Other name: Marc Skinner
- Spouse: Anne Skinner
- Allegiance: Cosa Nostra

Domenico Rancadore (aka Marc Skinner and "the teacher") is accused by the Italian government of being a past boss in the Sicilian Mafia, also known as Cosa Nostra. Italian police listed him as one of Italy's "most wanted criminals".

== Mafia ==
The BBC described him as "head of a crime family", and the Italian press identified him as the one-time boss of the Mafia organisation in the town of Trabia, in the province of Palermo. The Italian deputy prime minister, Angelino Alfano, said he is an "important mobster".

In 1993, after Rancadore was found not guilty of Mafia-related crimes by Italian courts, he moved to England. The Italian courts convicted Rancadore in 1999 in absentia of being part of a criminal organisation; he was sentenced to seven years in jail on that charge.

== England ==
After he moved to England in 1993, Rancadore opened a travel agency with his wife. While English authorities were aware that Rancadore was in London they were unable to arrest him because, unlike Italy, in England, Mafia association is not a crime. Italian authorities asked for his extradition to Italy in January 2012, which was denied by the British authorities. According to Vittorio Teresi from the prosecution office in Palermo: "The crime of Mafia association is not recognised in the British legal system. The extradition request was not even considered."

== Arrest ==
Rancadore was arrested on 7 August 2013 in Manor Waye, Uxbridge, London. When he saw the police, he left his house via a back door in an attempt to escape but was apprehended by a waiting policeman. After he was captured, a new arrest warrant was made, as Rancadore's lawyers claimed that the previous warrant contained "significant deficiencies". Rancadore was arrested following a European arrest warrant being issued.

=== Trial ===
Rancadore was denied bail by a judge at Westminster Magistrates' Court and had an extradition hearing set for 25 November 2013. Gaetano Lima, a past member of the mafia turned informer, described Rancadore as dangerous. The representative for the defense questioned whether Rancadore was a leader in the Mafia.

On February 28, 2014, the extradition hearing was adjourned until Monday March 17, when it was determined at Westminster Magistrates' Court that Rancadore would not be extradited back to Italy. District judge Howard Riddle said a recent decision of the Administrative Court, which binds lower courts in England, led to his decision.

=== Concerns ===
Rancadore raised concerns that if he was extradited back to Italy, he would be killed by the Mafia. Rancadore reportedly said that "I’m not going back, they’ll kill me".
