= Donald Hodge (veteran) =

Donald Arthur Hodge (1894–1997) was one of the last surviving veterans of the First World War.

Hodge was born in Kent, England, and was educated at The Judd School in Tonbridge, where he had a house named in his honour. Following the outbreak of war, Hodge – like many others – enlisted in the armed forces with the illusion of being part of a glorious battle.

"I was in a crowd of other 18, 19, 20-year old boys and we thought it was going to be a tremendous lark to go and knock the Kaiser off his throne."

Hodge survived the war, but with great regret – stating ""I lost all my youth, the best years of my life you might say and I lost so many friends. A few medals don't make up for that. Nobody wins in a war. They lost; we didn't win."

In 1995 (where he lived in Seaford, East Sussex) after passing 100 years old, Hodge was one of the veterans to appear in "Age of Hope" – the first part of the Emmy Award-winning BBC/PBS series "People's Century" – where he recounted his experiences of the war. He also appeared in the second part of ABC's 1999 series "The Century: America's Time", in a segment entitled "Shell Shock – The Great War". He was President of the British First World War Veterans’ Association.
