= Lynn Wallis =

Diana Lynn Wallis OBE FISTD FRAD (born 11 December 1946) has been the artistic director of the Royal Academy of Dance for 22 years, from 1994 and will be retiring at the end of 2016.

Wallis was born on 11 December 1946 in Windsor, the daughter of Dennis and Joan Wallis (née Gatcombe), and educated at Tonbridge Grammar School.

Wallis was co-artistic director (with Valerie Wilder) at the National Ballet of Canada, from 1987 to 1989.

In 2015, Wallis was awarded an OBE for services to dance.
In 2017 she was made a Fellow of the Royal Academy of Dance (FRAD)

Wallis is a board member of The Royal Ballet Benevolent Fund (aka The Dance Professionals Fund).
