= Rob Crilly =

British-Irish journalist and author

Rob Crilly (born 1973) is a British-Irish journalist and author and chief U.S. correspondent for the Daily Telegraph. He is formerly the White House correspondent for the Washington Examiner and a former chief U.S. political correspondent for the Daily Mail.

== Education ==
Crilly was educated at The Judd School, Tonbridge, and read Natural Sciences at Downing College, Cambridge.

== Career ==
Crilly began his career as a sub-editor at the Chester Chronicle before joining the Press and Journal (Aberdeen) and then moved to The Herald, where he was Edinburgh bureau chief.

He was East Africa correspondent for The Times, and in 2007 was one of the few British journalists in Khartoum when a teacher, Gillian Gibbons, was arrested. He appeared on ITN and Sky News discussing the case.

Crilly was then appointed Pakistan correspondent for the Daily Telegraph, before he later moved to covering US news. In 2014, Crilly was among the journalists arrested while covering civil unrest in Ferguson, Mo, following the shooting of Michael Brown. He has been a White House correspondent for the Washington Examiner since 2019.

As a freelance journalist, Crilly has also written for The Irish Times, The Daily Mail and The Christian Science Monitor. His articles have appeared in The Scotsman, USA Today, News of the World, The Sunday Times and The Sunday Telegraph.

Since 2008 he has blogged for the Frontline Club.

Rob Crilly's book Saving Darfur: Everyone's Favourite African War, based on four years of reporting on Sudan and extensive travels through the region, was published in February 2010.

== Personal life ==
His sister, Anna Crilly, is a comedian and actress who stars in Lead Balloon.
