= Philip Goodrich =

British Anglican bishop (1929–2001)

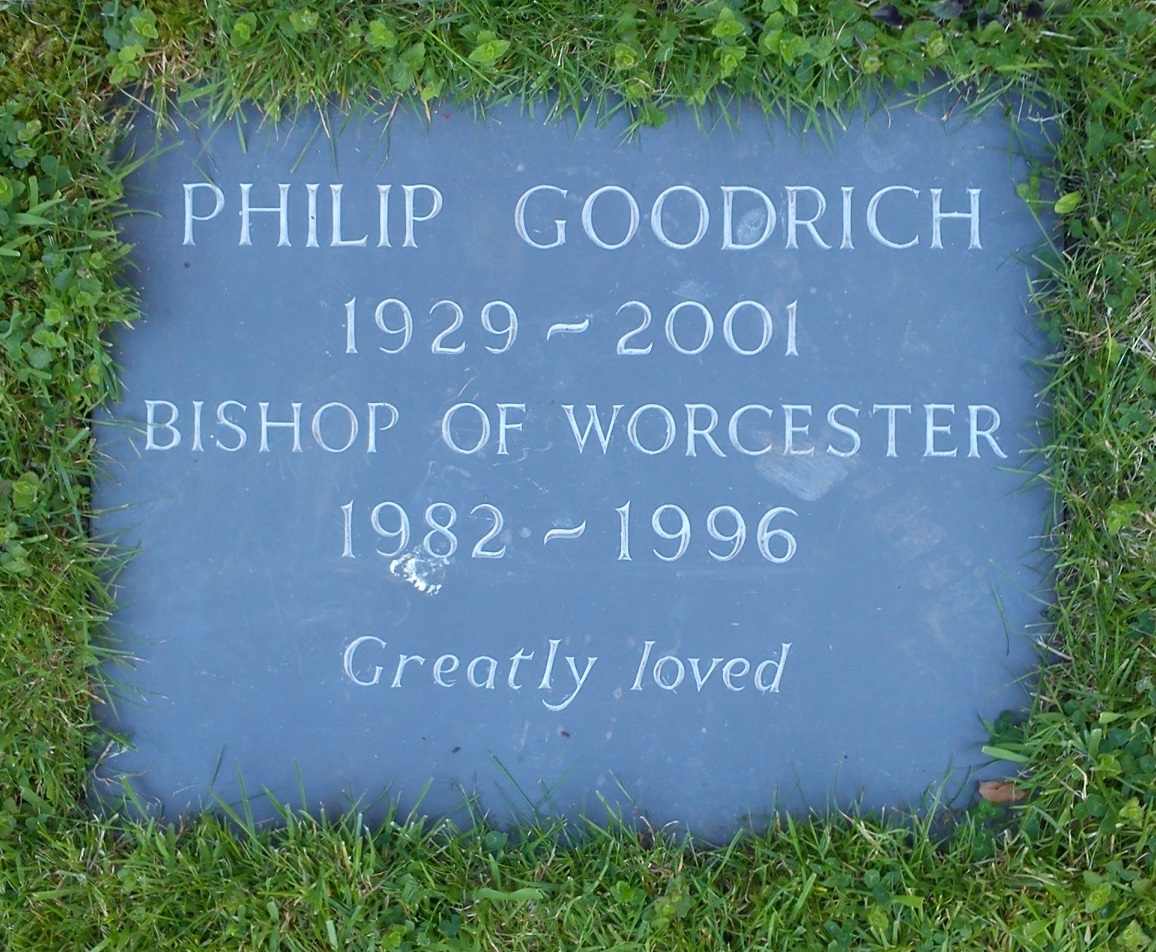
Worcester Cathedral, grave of Goodrich in the cathedral cloisters

Philip Harold Ernest Goodrich (2 November 1929 – 22 January 2001) was a British Anglican bishop in the late 20th century. He was Bishop of Tonbridge from 1973 to 1982 and Bishop of Worcester from 1982 to 1996.

== Early life ==
Born on 2 November 1929, Goodrich was educated at Stamford School and St John's College, Cambridge.

== Ministry ==
Goodrich studied for ordination at Ripon College Cuddesdon followed by a curacy at Rugby in Warwickshire. From 1957 to 1961 he was chaplain of St John's College, Cambridge (his own university college), before incumbencies in South Ormsby and Bromley.

In 1973, he was ordained to the episcopate as Bishop of Tonbridge, a suffragan bishopric in the Diocese of Rochester. He was translated to the Diocese of Worcester in 1982 where he was Bishop of Worcester, the diocesan bishop. He was enthroned at Worcester Cathedral on 22 May 1982, his canonical election having been confirmed since 2 April. He retired in 1996.

He died on 22 January 2001. His ashes are buried in the cloisters of Worcester Cathedral.

Church of England titles
Preceded by Henry David Halsey	Bishop of Tonbridge; 1973 – 1982	Succeeded by David Bartleet
Preceded by Robert Wilmer Woods	Bishop of Worcester; 1982 – 1996	Succeeded by Peter Selby
