= Fergus Anckorn =

British Army soldier

Fergus Gordon Anckorn (10 December 1918 – 22 March 2018) was a British soldier who, as starting as the conjurer Wizardus at age 18, was the longest-serving member of the Magic Circle.

Anckorn was born on 10 December 1918 in Dunton Green and educated at The Judd School in Tonbridge. At the age of eighteen, he became the youngest member of the Magic Circle. During World War II, he served in the British Army, was captured by the Japanese during the fall of Singapore, and forced, as a prisoner of war, to work on the Burma Railway and the famous bridge on the River Kwai.

He was interviewed about his war experiences. He died of bladder cancer on 22 March 2018 aged 99.
