= Martin Purdy =

English rugby union player

Martin Purdy (born 29 October 1981) is an English former rugby union player who played for London Welsh, Bath Rugby, and Wasps. Purdy's position of choice was at lock.

== Career ==
Purdy was born in Crawley, West Sussex and attended The Judd School in Tonbridge. Following his A-levels, Purdy accepted an offer to study at Fitzwilliam College, Cambridge, where he completed his undergraduate degree. However, Purdy also signed a part-time contract as an academy player for Premiership side Wasps, and combined his studies with training while at Cambridge. Purdy gained a Blue at Twickenham in 2000, when he became the youngest forward to represent Cambridge in The Varsity Match in over a decade.

Purdy signed a senior contract with Wasps in 2003 and made 51 appearances for them over the next 4 years. He played as a replacement when Wasps won both the 2003–04 Premiership Final and the 2004–05 Premiership Final. He was also a replacement for the victorious 2004 Heineken Cup Final. He then joined Bath Rugby. After just a year at Bath, Purdy was signed by New Zealand side North Harbour in April 2008, alongside former Wasps team mate Dave Walder. Purdy has also played for L'Aquila, in Italy.

In 2010 Purdy signed for London Welsh, making 56 appearances for the club before leaving in 2013.
