= Rob Warner (academic) =

Robert Ernest Warner was Vice-Chancellor of Plymouth Marjon University since March 2017 and retired at the end of 2022. Having previously held the position of Executive Dean of Humanities & Professor of Religion, Culture and Society at the University of Chester.

He was educated at Reigate Grammar School, Woking Grammar School, The Judd School, the University of York (BA; MA, English and Related Literature), Regent's Park College, Oxford (MA, Theology), and completed his PhD in theology at King's College London in 2006.
