= James Miller (novelist) =

British novelist and academic (born 1976)

- Born: 1976 (age 49–50); London
- Occupations: Novelist, academic

James Miller (born 1976) is a British novelist and academic.

== Education and early life ==
James Miller was born in London in 1976. Miller began his education at Reigate Grammar School and the Judd School, Tonbridge. He studied English literature at Keble College, Oxford and has an MA in Anglo-American literary relations from UCL. In 2006 he completed his PhD in African-American literature and civil rights at King's College London.

== Books ==
Miller is known for complex, literary novels that play with genre and engage with contemporary issues. His first, Lost Boys (Little, Brown) received positive reviews in The Times, The Guardian, The Independent, Time Out, The Telegraph and the Sunday Independent and many other publications. He was one of Time Out magazine’s ‘rising literary stars’ for 2008. Miller’s second novel, Sunshine State, is a dystopian cli-fi thriller that reworks elements of Conrad’s Heart of Darkness. Miller has published numerous short stories, book reviews and a number of academic articles. His most recent story, ‘What Do You See When You Close Your Eyes’ was published in Beacons: Stories for our Not So Distant Future. Since 2010 Miller has been senior lecturer in Creative Writing and English literature at Kingston University.
