= Michael Willard =

English cricketer (1938–2019)

Michael James Lewis Willard (24 March 1938 – 19 September 2019) was an English cricketer who played 41 first-class cricket matches for Cambridge University between 1959 and 1961. He was a right-arm medium bowler and a left-handed batsman.

Willard was born at Hawkhurst in Kent and attended The Judd School in Tonbridge before going up to Corpus Christi College, Cambridge. He played cricket whilst at school and played for the Kent Second XI from 1957 until 1961, playing in both the Minor Counties Championship and Second XI Championship for the side. He played football whilst at Cambridge and won cricket Blues in each of his three years at the university.

Willard continued playing club cricket after he left university, playing until at least 1976 for sides including MCC and Free Foresters.

Willard died on 19 September 2019.
