= Russell White (bishop) =

Russell Berridge White was the inaugural Bishop of Tonbridge from 1959 to 1968.

Born on 13 December 1896 he was educated at the City of Oxford School and (after wartime service with the Queen's Own Oxfordshire Hussars) St Edmund Hall, Oxford. After this he studied for ordination at Wycliffe Hall, Oxford followed by a curacy at St Philemon, Toxteth. He was made deacon at Michaelmas 1923 (23 September) by Francis Chavasse, Bishop of Liverpool, and ordained priest the Michaelmas following (28 September 1924) by Albert David, Bishop of Liverpool – both times at Liverpool Cathedral. Between 1929 and 1933 he was Vicar of St Chrysostom, Everton and then until 1937 he was Chaplain to the Mercers' Company and Secretary of the Evangelical Churchmens Ordination Council, with an office in St Mary Woolnoth in the City of London. From 1937 to 1945 he was Vicar of St Stephens, East Twickenham. From 1945 until his retirement in 1968 he served as firstly Vicar and Rural Dean and then Bishop of Tonbridge. He was consecrated a bishop on 6 January 1959, by Geoffrey Fisher, Archbishop of Canterbury, at Westminster Abbey. From 1968 until his death in 1978 he was Assistant Bishop in the Guildford Diocese. Described by The Times as "one of the most trusted of his generation of evangelical leaders" he died on 12 December 1979, the day before his 83rd birthday.

Church of England titles
New title	Bishop of Tonbridge; 1959 – 1968	Succeeded by Henry David Halsey
