= The Judd School =

Location
- Brook Street; Tonbridge, Kent, TN9 2PN; England; 51°11′17″N 0°15′52″E

Information
- Other name: Judd
- Type: Voluntary aided school
- Motto: Latin: Deus Dat Incrementum (God Gives Growth / God Gives Gifts)
- Established: 1888; 138 years ago
- Founder: Worshipful Company of Skinners
- Local authority: Kent County Council
- Department for Education URN: 118843 Tables
- Ofsted: Reports
- Chairman: Charles Doyle
- Head teacher: Jonathan Wood
- Teaching staff: 85 (2024)
- Gender: Boys (11 to 16); Mixed (16 to 18)
- Age range: 11–18
- Enrolment: 1,152 (2019)
- Capacity: 1,472
- Houses: Bryant; Evans; Morgan; Rendall; Starling; Taylor
- Colours: Navy and maroon
- Alumni: Old Juddians
- Website: www.judd.online

The Judd School (often known simply as Judd) is a voluntary aided grammar school and sixth form in Tonbridge, Kent, England. It was established in 1888 at Stafford House on East Street in Tonbridge, where it remained for eight years before moving to its present location on Brook Street, in the south of the town. Founded by the Worshipful Company of Skinners, it was named after 16th-century merchant Sir Andrew Judde, whose endowment helped fund the school. The Skinners' Company maintains close links with the school and makes up the majority of the governing body.

There are over 1400 pupils in the school aged 11 to 18; the lower school is all boys, but of over 500 pupils aged 16–18 in the sixth form, about a fifth are external joiners, many of them girls. The first headmaster was William Bryant, who oversaw the transition to the present site before his retirement in 1908. The current headmaster as of 2025 is Jon Wood, who replaced the previous headmaster, Robert Masters, at the start of the 2017-18 academic year.

Judd pupils generally take eleven General Certificate of Secondary Education (GCSE) tests in Year Eleven (aged 15–16), and are encouraged to take four A-levels in the sixth form. An Office for Standards in Education, Children's Services and Skills (Ofsted) inspection in 2015 graded the school as "outstanding", and league tables published by the Daily Telegraph based on 2013 A-level results rank Judd as the second best (or best, if independent schools are excluded) school in Kent. In 2013, The Sunday Times ranked the school as the 12th best state secondary school (for pupils aged 11–16, with an optional two further years of education in sixth form) in the country. The majority of pupils go on to higher education following the completion of their A-levels at the end of Year Thirteen (aged 17–18), and in 2017, over one in five (38) Year 13 students gained an Oxbridge offer.

In September 2004, the school was designated a music and mathematics specialist school, which means it receives additional funding for those subjects. In 2007, the school was invited to become a High Performing Specialist School, and in April 2008 was successful in attaining science specialism status. As mathematics is automatically included under a science specialism, the school selected English to be included under the first specialism. The Judd School is now a specialist school in music with English, science and mathematics.

== History ==
=== Early years: 1888–1918 ===
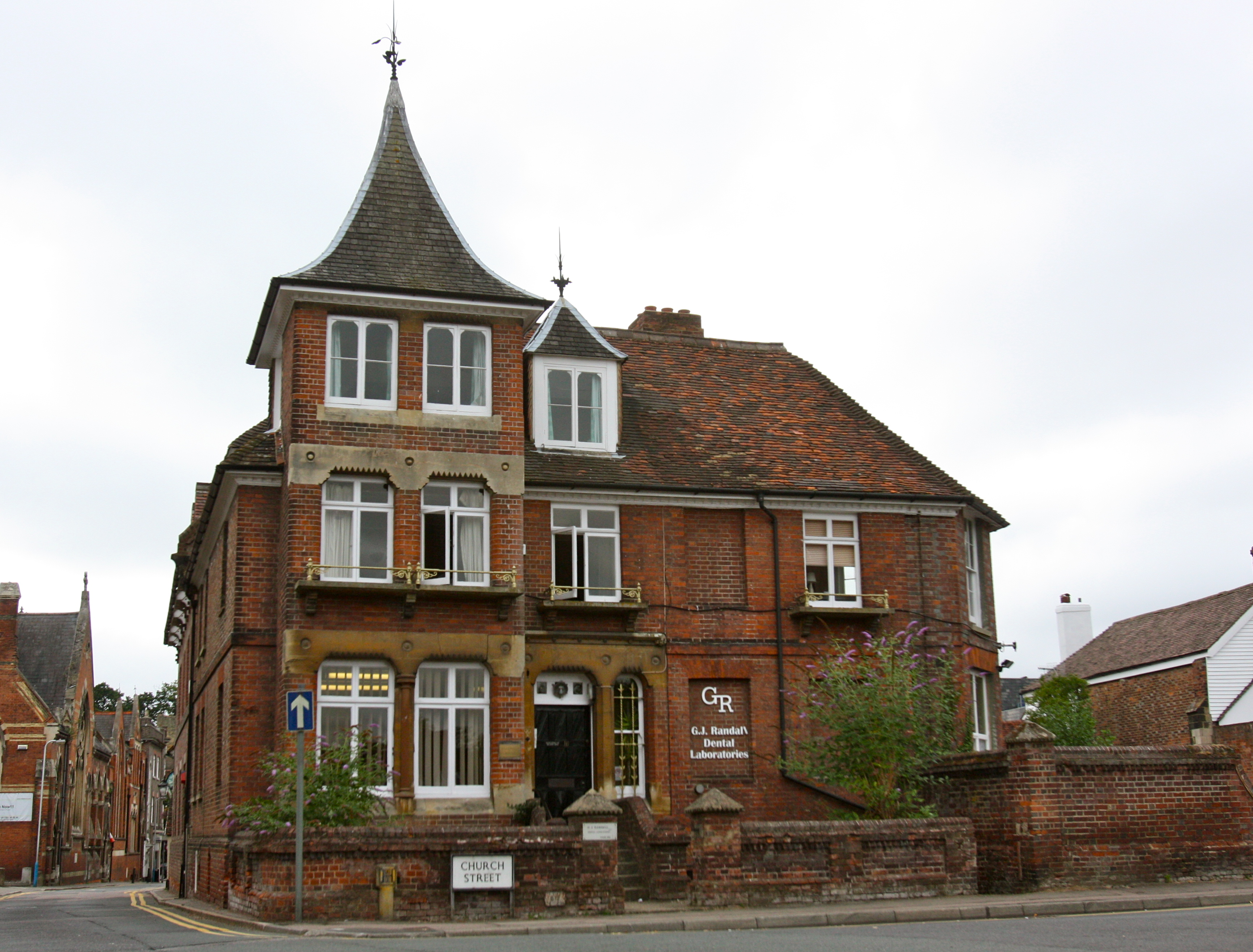
Stafford House on East Street, the first site of The Judd School

The Judd School was established in 1888, but the need for a secondary school to supplement Sir Andrew Judde’s Grammar School, a public school (now called Tonbridge School) was acknowledged as early as 1870. It was revealed that only one in 200 of its pupils was the son of a Tonbridge tradesman, as was required in its endowment. Tonbridge School had been founded in 1553 by Sir Andrew Judd, (Note: Some sources spell the name "Judde": "[1887] Sir Andrew had by now lost the final "e" of his surname". He stopped using it when he became Lord mayor of London-) who made a fortune in the Muscovy fur trade during the 16th century. His endowment was left in the hands of the Skinners Company, who agreed to fund the establishment of a commercial school in Tonbridge in 1875. However, the Charity Commissioners – empowered by the 1869 Endowed Schools Act to govern the establishment of charitably funded schools – directed that the £20,000 provided by The Skinners' Company for this cause be taken to neighbouring Tunbridge Wells, where it was used to establish The Skinners' School in September 1887.

Demand persisted for a similar school in Tonbridge; in July 1888, William J. D. Bryant, previously an assistant master at Tonbridge School, was named headmaster of Sir Andrew Judd's Commercial School, which opened on 17 September at Stafford House in East Street, Tonbridge. The funds were provided by a loan of £13,000 repaid over the next 20 years with income from the Judd Foundation (of which The Skinners' Company were trustees), which rapidly increased when the leases on the Sandhills Estate in London were renewed in 1906. The school also benefited from at least £500 per year from the Judd Foundation, after funding for Tonbridge School was reduced. Although established on a tentative basis, the school's early success led to its move to a larger, purpose-built site in south Tonbridge in 1896.

William Bryant retired as headmaster in 1908 and was replaced by John Evans, appointed in preference to the 217 other applicants for the post. Previously headmaster of Ashford Grammar School, Evans took up his new position at the conclusion of the autumn term. He oversaw a period of change and modernisation, including the transition from gas to electric lighting, and the introduction of a house system in 1909. Soon after the outbreak of the First World War the school was requisitioned by the War Office to house two brigades, from Folkestone and Aldershot. In 1917, the school Cadet Corps was established, which within one month consisted of 120 pupils. The following year, and according to Taylor (1988) "much to the Headmaster's distaste", the first female teachers were appointed after the deaths of several male members of staff.

=== Inter-war years: 1919–1939 ===
In June 1919, soon after the passage of Education Act 1918, the school successfully applied for grant-earning status and became partly state-funded. As a consequence, it became necessary to introduce a composite governing board (including public representatives) and to offer free places, equal to 25 per cent of the normal number of admissions. In 1925, the school saw its first students enter the Oxbridge universities and changed its name to simply The Judd School. Evans retired in 1928 and was replaced by Welshman Cecil Lloyd Morgan who beat 164 other applicants to a job which carried an annual salary of £650. He oversaw a change in the curriculum such that each form was divided into two streams, of which one took Latin, the other more vocational subjects. Morgan continued as many of the Judd customs as long as he could, including the tradition of donating £20 per year to send a Barnardo boy to Australia or Canada.

=== Second World War: 1939–1945 ===
The outbreak of the Second World War on 3 September 1939 delayed the commencement of the Autumn Term until trenches could be dug at the school. To avoid the bombing raids, 369 students of the Westminster City School in London were evacuated to The Judd School in the relative safety of Tonbridge. Initially, each school used the facilities three days per week, but Taylor (1988) notes that "imaginative timetables" enabled all Judd pupils to attend five days a week by the end of 1941. The Westminster boys were instructed to further evacuate to Exmouth, Devon in July 1944, but ended up fleeing back to London. In a bombing raid that same year a rocket shell exploded in a neighbouring field, destroying more than 200 panes of glass and numerous doors and windows. By the end of the war, 60 former pupils had lost their lives, and 48 were decorated. On 31 December 1944, The Judd School became the first in the country to be awarded the status of a voluntarily aided grammar school in new legislation brought in by the Butler Education Act, which meant it received state funding, but could continue to select pupils by ability.

=== Post-war years: 1945–1986 ===
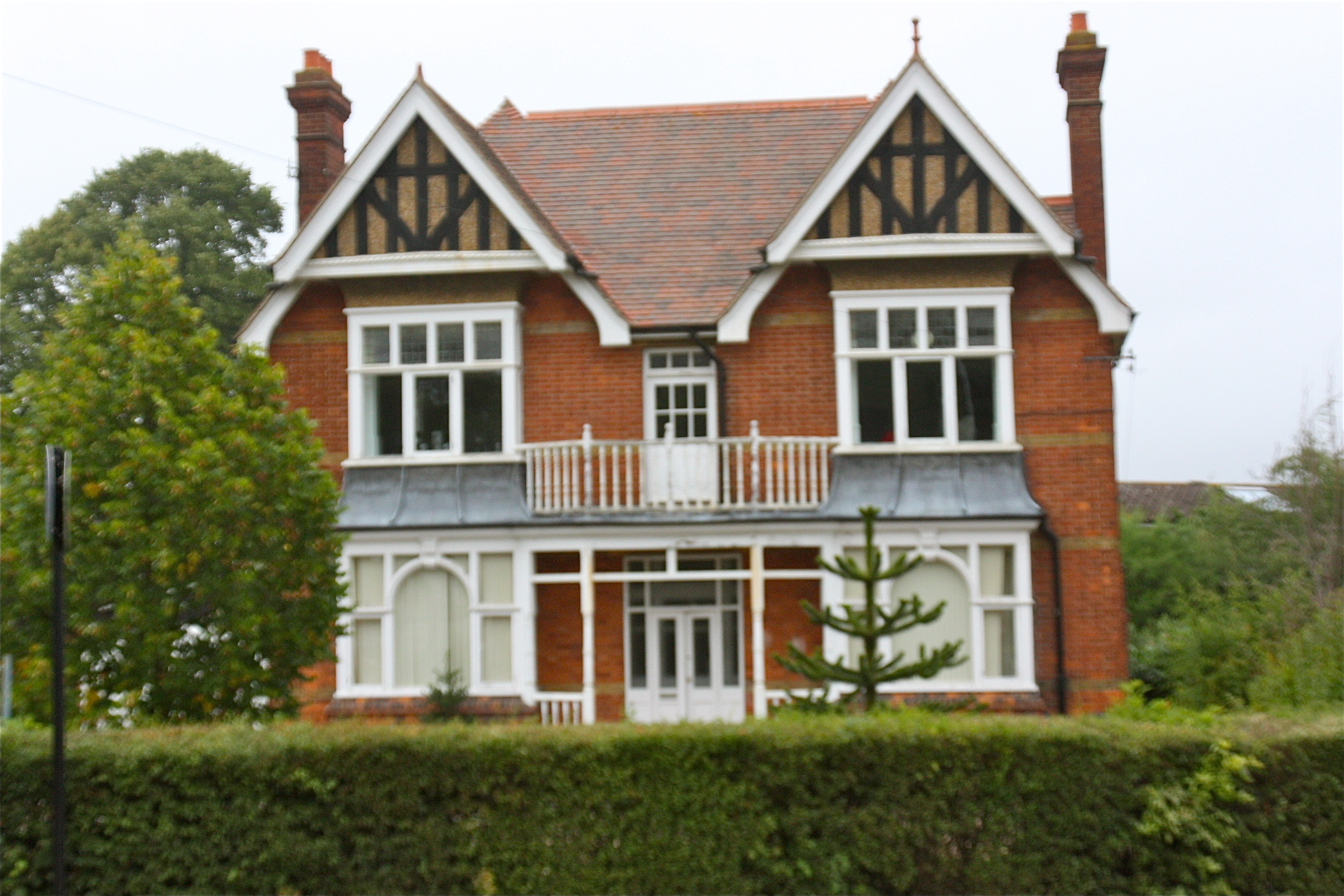
10 Brook Street is known as Lawton's, after a former head of the Kent Education Committee who funded its purchase.

Francis Hillier Taylor, previously senior history master at The Skinners' School, was appointed as Morgan's successor at the end of the spring term in 1946, a position that attracted 321 applications. During his tenure, Taylor significantly expanded the school facilities: in 1948, the headmaster's living quarters were converted to include a secretaries office, waiting room and medical inspection room (the headmaster moved to neighbouring Brook House, which was purchased by The Skinners' Company). In 1955, new geography rooms were constructed, followed three years later by a new gymnasium. Although not first used until two years later, a swimming pool was constructed in 1964 at the cost of £9,000. Taylor also introduced some major curriculum changes, including the introduction of new subjects such as rural biology and zoology.

Denis Rendall took over in 1970, at a time when the future of the school was under threat from the Circular 10/65, which proposed the abolition of grammar schools, which select pupils according to their academic ability, in favour of the comprehensive schools, which are non-selective state funded schools. He oversaw the building of the new art and crafts department building, currently the R.E. block, which opened in May 1974, and the purchase of a neighbouring detached house, 10 Brook Street, by the Kent Education Committee. Known as "Lawton's", this building is now used by music department, and contains a suite of computers, and also houses a changing room for female pupils. Rendall experienced a high turnover of staff: 31 teachers were at the school in the year of his arrival, and 43 joined and left the school between 1970 and 1986. He increased the number of female staff from zero to seven during his tenure, and the student body grew from 463 to 746 during these years.

=== Recent years: 1986–present ===
Rendall was succeeded in 1986 by Keith Starling, who further developed and expanded the school to celebrate its centenary; the £2 million Cohen Building was constructed in 1991, followed by a £1.4 million music centre in 1995. Other developments include the Library Building, built in 2002, and a new sports hall in 2003; much of the construction funds was raised by parents. More recent developments include the Atwell building – which houses Maths and Geography – and the Ashton building – which houses the school's new canteen as well as four Biology laboratories.

After Starling's retirement in 2004, Robert Masters was appointed as his replacement and oversaw the school's transition to music and maths specialist status in 2004. Following an "outstanding" result in a 2007 Ofsted inspection, the school was invited to become a High Performing Specialist School and in April 2008 was successful in attaining science specialism status. As mathematics is automatically included under a science specialism, the school selected English to join music under the first specialism. Masters also organised the building of the school's all-weather pitch, which was completed in 2006.

== Governance ==
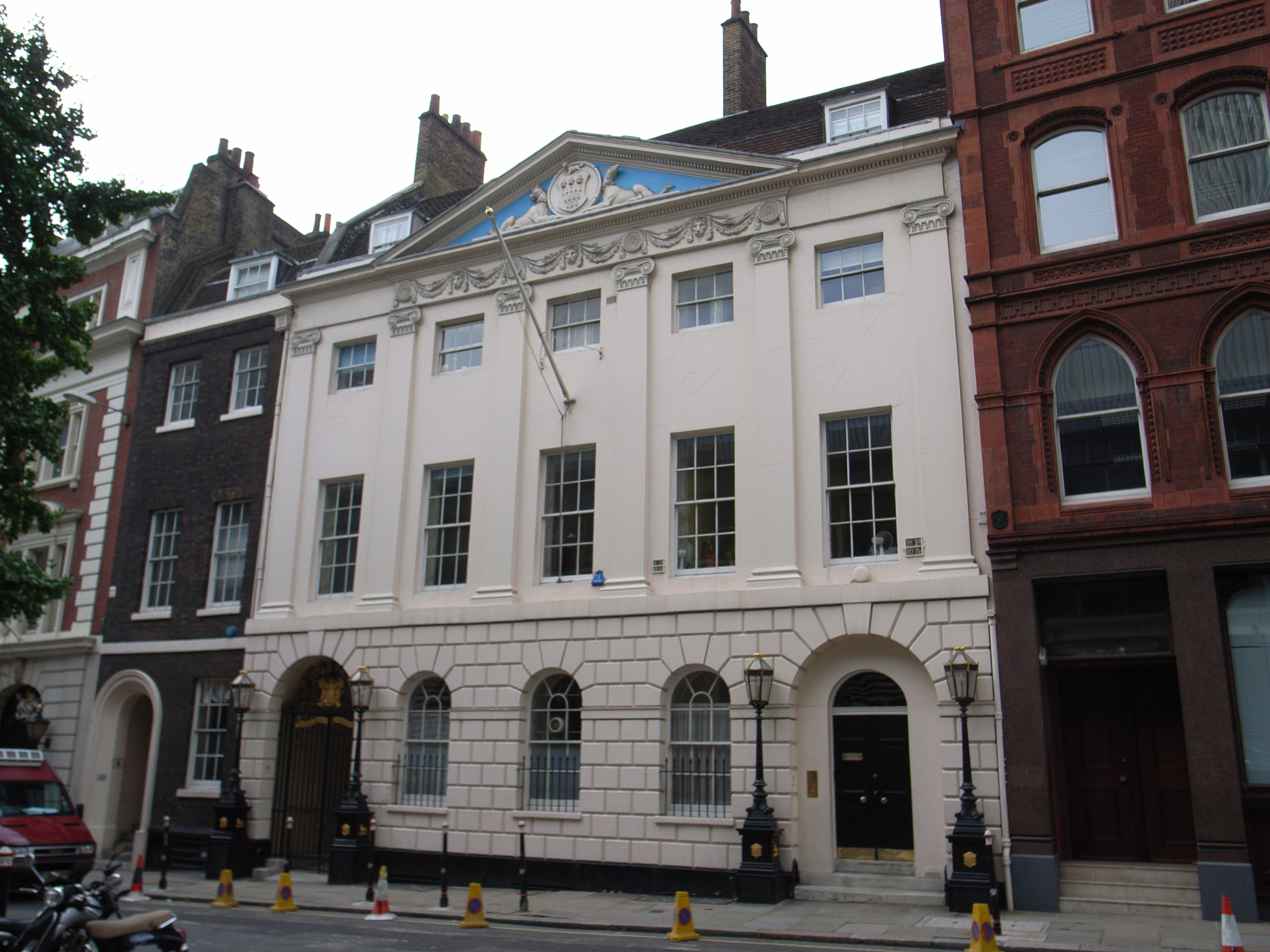
Skinners' Hall, the headquarters of the Worshipful Company of Skinners

The Judd School foundation document, which was approved by Queen Victoria on 15 October 1889, stipulated that the Board of Governors had right of appointment and dismissal of the headmaster, who has the same powers over the rest of the staff. Major decisions were made by The Skinners' Company, but its powers were restricted by the Charity Commissioners, who were granted considerable powers under the Endowed Schools Act. Soon after the First World War, in the wake of the Education Act 1918, the Burnham Scale of teacher's salaries came into force and the school was forced to enter into negotiations with the Kent Education Committee to meet the increased expenditure; the Court of The Skinners' Company approved the school becoming grant earning in June 1919. It became necessary to appoint a composite governing body, a third of them public representatives nominated by the Kent Education Committee, who also had some control over school affairs. Subsequently, a fee of one guinea was paid to those who attended meetings of the governing body, the first of which was held on 4 February 1920, at Skinners' Hall in London.

After applying for voluntary aided status, the school was required to adopt new Articles of Government on 31 December, 1944. It became the first school in the country to be awarded the dual control of state funding and limited independence. The Kent Education Committee funded free dinners for some pupils, travel and maintenance grants and created a common entrance exam. The current governing body consists of a chair and vice chair, ten foundation governors (elected by the Worshipful Company of Skinners), three parent governors, two Local Education Authority (LEA) governors, three staff governors, an education officer and clerk, education assistant, assistant clerk and the headmaster.

== School structure ==
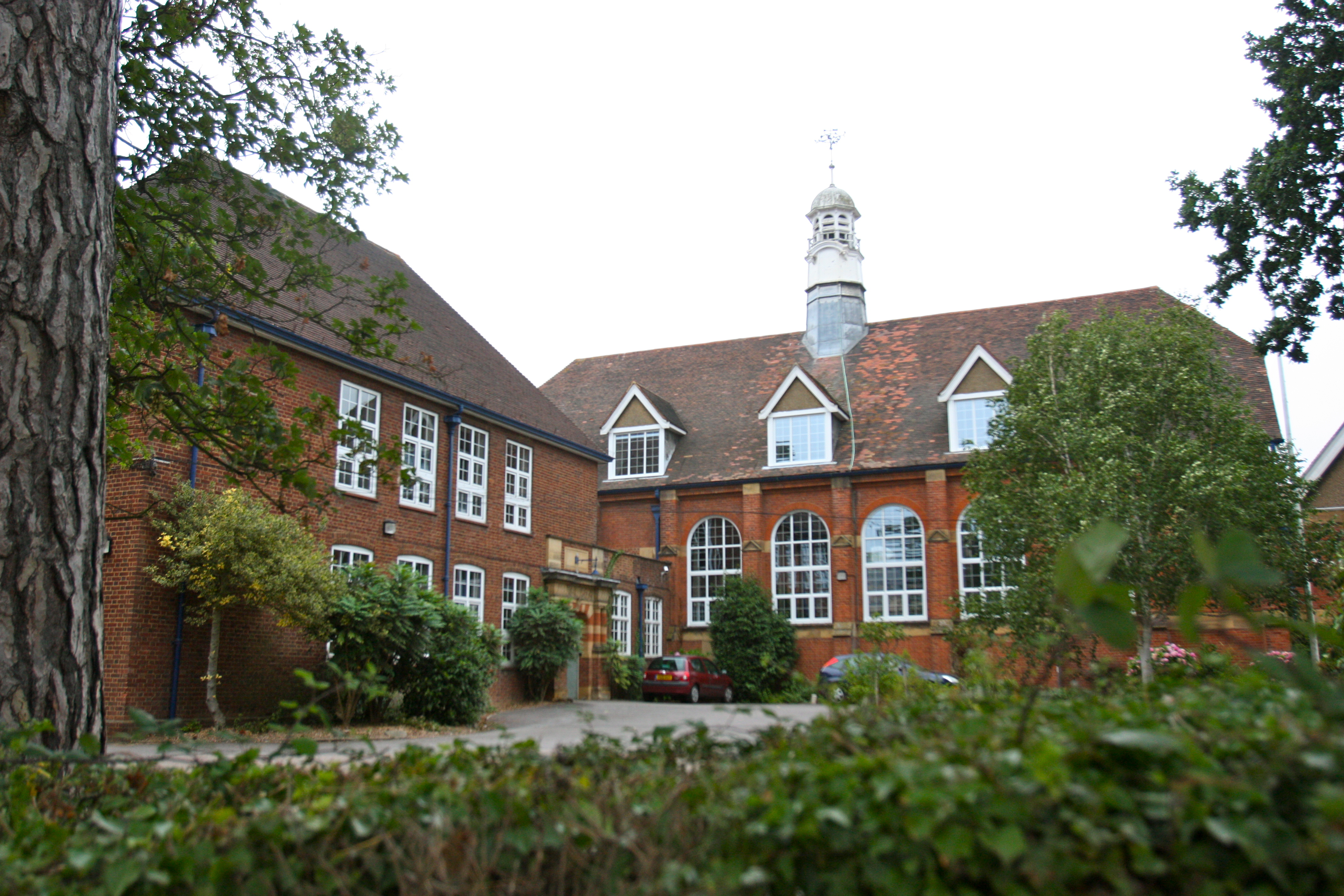
The main school building, from the south of the site

The majority of the school's first pupils joined from Gordon House, which was a successful private school on Hadlow Road run by T. E. Grice; after it was decided that the two schools should not compete, Grice was appointed deputy headmaster of The Judd School. On the opening day, 40 boys were in attendance, rising to 50 by the end of the first term and to 115 in 1902. In 1917, the school had 244 pupils, which increased to 308 over the next 11 years, and reached 376 in 1935. In 1952, 380 boys were on the roll, which included 42 sixth form pupils. Under Denis Rendall, the school experienced a strong growth in numbers; in 1970, there were 463 pupils, increasing to 689 in 1978, and to 742 in 1986. At the last Ofsted inspection in 2007, The Judd School had 933 pupils. According to the school, as of 2010, the student body is made up of 935 pupils: 625 in the lower school and 310 in the sixth form, including about 60 girls. Many pupils come from affluent backgrounds and very few require free school meals; the number of pupils with disabilities, learning difficulties and special educational needs is well below the national average. The majority of pupils go on to higher education at the end of Year Thirteen.

The house system was first established in 1909, when there were three houses: Alpha, Beta and Gamma, each of which had a housemaster and captain. Boys remained in the same house for their entire school career, and would be joined by any siblings. Every year, the houses competed for the House Shield; points were awarded for all forms of competitions, from sword dancing to vaulting. In 1914, house colours were introduced; purple for Alpha, green for Beta, and scarlet for Gamma. As the student body increased, a fourth house – Delta – was formed in 1917, for which the colour was yellow. The house system was abolished in the 1980s, but re-introduced in September 2008, with houses named after notable alumni. The four houses were: Duke (after Neville Duke), Hodge (after Donald Hodge), Lewin (after Terence Lewin) and Powell (after Cecil Frank Powell). The house system was changed in 2017, due to a large increase in pupil numbers. There are currently six houses, named after previous headmasters (excluding Robert Masters, the seventh headmaster); Morgan, Starling, Rendall, Bryant, Taylor, Evans.

=== Lower school ===
In its early years, boys entered the school mainly from local elementary (now known as primary) schools from ages eight onwards; at that time, the maximum age of a pupil was 16, although any boy who reached this age during the course of a term was permitted to remain until the end of that term. In 1908, a government inspection noted that the average pupil remained at the school for three and a half years and left the school between the ages of 14 and 15, and that 20 per cent of the intake held scholarships. The lower school as it is today was first established by the "Five Year Plan" following a government inspection in 1933. In 1944, following the Butler Education Act, entrance to the school was gained through a common entrance exam, aged 11 or 12; five boys offered themselves for each place, and most came from local primary schools. Prior to the establishment of the sixth form, The Judd School passed several boys to Tonbridge School, or other grammar schools, to complete their education to the age of 18 or 19; £20 was paid as a leaving scholarship.

As of 2010, the lower school has an annual intake of around 125 boys at the beginning of Year Seven (aged 11). The lower school (Years 7–11) is 625 pupils (all boys) strong, for whom the school uniform consists of a navy blazer accompanied with the school badge on the breast pocket, with grey trousers and a grey or white shirt. Socks must be dark, and shoes must be black. Shirts must be worn with a tie, which varies according to the house in which the pupil is placed; green for Rendall, light blue for Starling, purple for Taylor, red for Bryant, yellow for Morgan, and orange for Evans.

=== Sixth form ===
The Judd School sixth form can be said to have been established as early as 1903 – in the wake of the Education Act 1902 – when the Pupil Teachers Scheme was born and The Judd School was used as a training centre for young teachers. However, normal pupils above the age of 16 were not permitted until 1919; previously, special permission from the governors was required to stay on beyond this age. A 1952 government inspection stated that 42 pupils were in the sixth form. Judd's sixth form has significantly grown over the last decade, consisting of 308 pupils at the last Ofsted inspection in 2007. A minimum of 40 offers per year will be made to external applicants; girls are admitted in Year Twelve (aged 16) and make up about 16 per cent of the sixth form. The sixth form has its own Common Room in the main school building, including a dedicated cafeteria and study area.

Boys may wear a dark grey or black suit, plain black, grey or navy V-neck sweater and a scarf of a plain colour. Girls may wear plain tailored suits (skirt or trousers) in black, navy or dark grey. Shirts may be plain grey, blue or white. There is a sixth form house tie available, although girls may choose to wear a pin badge instead.

=== Staff ===
In July 1904, The Judd School participated in the Pupil Teachers Scheme on an experimental basis. Established in the Education Act 1902, pupils would receive a normal secondary education, before receiving two years of training, splitting their time between a Pupil Teacher's Centre and practical experience at elementary and secondary schools. The experiment was dropped soon after the First World War. When the school became grant earning in 1919, the additional funds meant teachers received pensions under the School Teachers (Superannuation) Act 1918. In 1970, 31 staff taught 463 boys; 45 taught 745 in 1988. According to the 2009 school prospectus, there are 71 teaching staff, 20 visiting music staff and 36 additional support, administration and maintenance staff.

== Admission ==
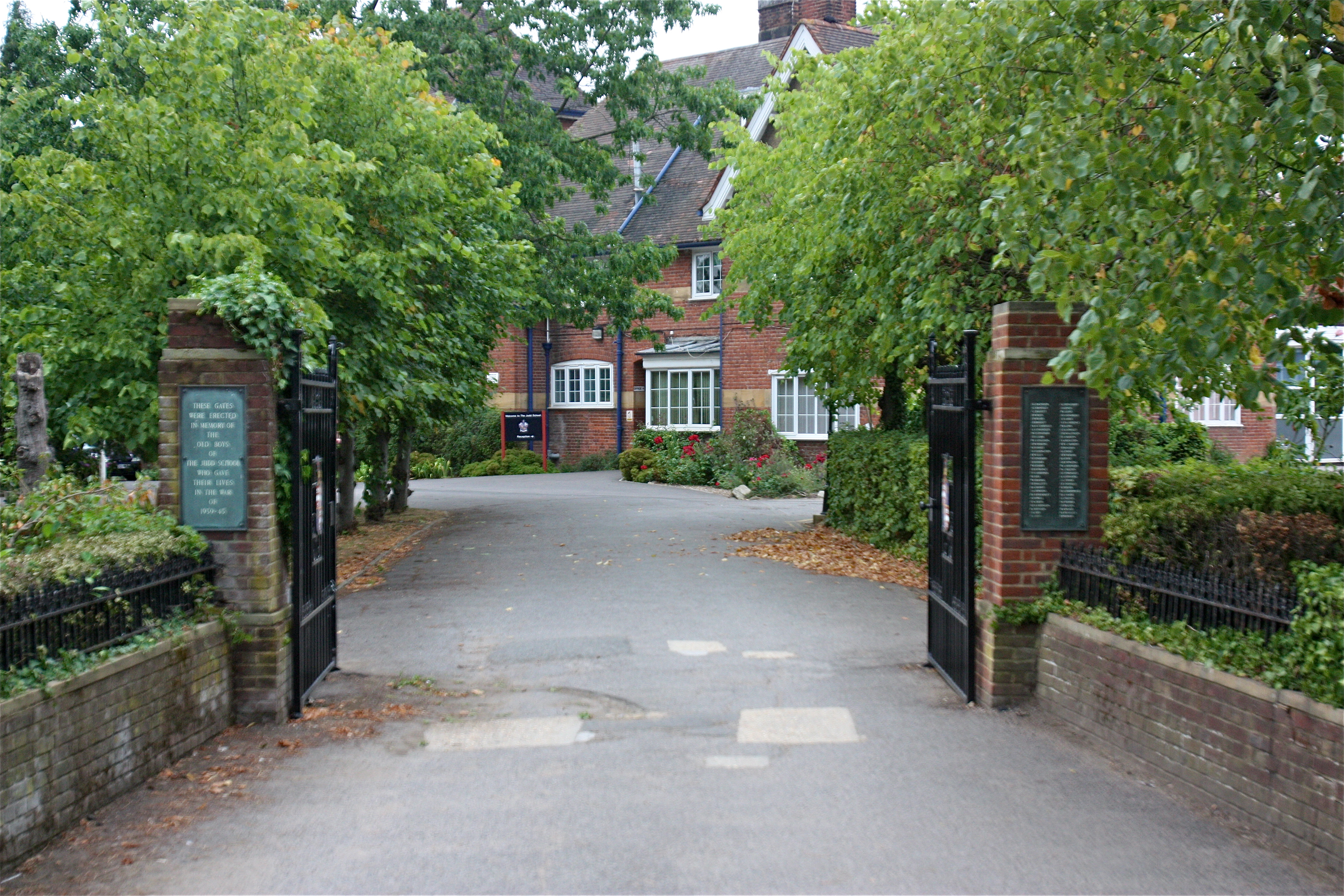
The main entrance to The Judd School, with gates that were erected in memory of former pupils and teachers who died in the Second World War

The Judd School opened as a day school for local pupils living with their parents, between the ages of 8 and 16. According to the foundation document, the conditions of entry were possession of a "good character" and "sufficient health"; sons of freemen of The Skinners' Company were given preference when the number of applicants exceeded the places available. During his tenure, William Bryant attempted to extend admission to boarders and estimated the costs to be £50 per term (including fees), but the Board of Governors rejected the idea. However, when a lack of public transport made day-to-day travel to the school impractical, boys were permitted to lodge from neighbouring villages and would stay at masters' homes or at hostels approved by the governors. Entry to the school was conditional upon a pupil passing an entrance exam, which would vary according to the age of the boy. However, the foundation document stipulated that every boy had to be able to read, write from dictation and perform sums in the "first four simple rules of Arithmetic, with the multiplication table".

The Education Act 1944 confirmed The Judd School as a grammar school, at which time it applied for voluntarily aided status, which required it to abolish fees under the principle of universal free education. The school was required to offer entrance via an entrance examination, now known as the 11-plus, which pupils take aged 10 or 11, depending on their date of birth. Provision was made for pupils to enter aged 13 or 14, for those that had failed the test two years earlier. While defining the school-leaving age as 15, the act granted the government the power to raise the age to 16 "as soon as the Minister is satisfied that it has become practicable", which happened in 1973.

Admission continues to be via the Eleven Plus examination; The Judd School complies with the Co-ordinated Admission Scheme, which is administered by the Kent Local Authority. All pupils must have gained a selective place through the Eleven Plus and placed The Judd School as a preference on their application form. Because the school is usually over-subscribed, priority is given to students in Local Authority Care in the first instance. Students are then ranked according to their aggregate scores in the Eleven Plus, and the distance from a student’s home to the school (as the crow flies) is used as a tiebreaker.

Pupils are also admitted to the sixth form aged 16 or 17, for which similar criteria are applied. External students must have at least five predicted A* GCSEs and will be given conditional offers based on how high their predicted grades are. In the event of over-subscription, priority will be given to internal applicants, followed by external applicants in Local Authority Care. Students are then ranked according to their predicted or actual GCSE results, and the distance to school is again used as a tiebreaker. Should entrance be refused for any reason, parents have a statutory right of appeal, which is heard by the governors of the school. In 2007, the school was ordered to pay compensation to two pupils after it was deemed that they did not receive fair appeals because of what the Local Government Ombudsman deemed "inappropriate links" between the appeals panel and the governors.

=== Fees ===
The foundation document stipulated that fees were to be fixed by the governors and could range from £4–8 per year; in 1888, the fees charged were £7/10s per year. Provision was made for the allocation of scholarships to the value of the tuition fees for one in every ten boys in the school; one-half of the scholarships were arranged by the governors and awarded only to boys who had spent three years education in a public elementary school. Around the turn of the 20th century, an attempt was made to attract younger boys into the school by reducing fees for those under the age of 12 from £2/20s to £2 per term.

In July 1919, the school applied for grant-earning status, and as a result, 25 per cent of the places became free. As part of this change, the fee structure was changed to £3/10s per term, or ten guineas per annum. In 1944, in accordance with the Butler Education Act, fees were abolished under the principle of universal free education. Parents are encouraged to contribute to The Judd School Development Fund, which raises money for future construction projects.

The school continues to be state-funded and thus charges no fees.

== Curriculum ==
The first prospectus promised "religious instruction in accordance with the principles of the Christian Faith" and the following subjects: reading, writing, arithmetic, geography, history, English (grammar, composition, and literature), Latin, at least one other foreign European language, mathematics, bookkeeping, natural science, drawing, drill, and vocal music. It also said that instruction may also be given "in the use of tools for working in wood", for which a carpentry shed was placed in the yard of Stafford House. At the turn of the 20th century, 15 subjects were taught and lessons lasted one hour; school began at nine, and the day included 15 minutes of hymns, prayers and roll calls.

German was first introduced into the curriculum in 1931, the same time at which the school began to offer voluntary after-school art classes. F. H. Taylor attempted to achieve equilibrium in the curriculum between arts and science subjects; he made woodwork and art continuous for an entire term and introduced a geography course for the Higher School Certificate. In 1948, rural biology was added to the curriculum for the first time, for which the headmaster provided a plot of land to be used as a vegetable plot. At the end of that year, an after-school study period was introduced; following the seven normal periods (five in the morning, two in the afternoon), students were to either begin their homework, or attend a school society. However, the 1950s saw a definite swing towards maths and science, and a subsequent increase in staffing in those departments. In 1957, zoology and botany was taught at A-level for the first time, and physics and chemistry replaced rural biology at O-level (now replaced by the GCSE).

As of 2025, the school follows the National Curriculum in Years 7–11 and offers a broad range of GCSEs (national exams taken by students aged 14–16) and A-levels (national exams taken by pupils aged 16–18). The school has no affiliation with a particular religious denomination, but religious education is given throughout the school, and boys must take the subject as part of their GCSE course. Students participate in a number of educational visits and excursions throughout their school career, and Year Twelve students participate in a five-day work experience programme. The curriculum comprises English, Mathematics, three separate sciences (Biology, Chemistry and Physics), 3 Languages (French, German and Latin), History, Geography, Religious Education, Computer Science, Art, Drama, Music, Design and Technology, PE and Games, and a bespoke Learn, Grow, Belong (PSHE) curriculum. In the second year, students are divided in Mathematics, based on their ability. Boys usually take eleven subjects for GCSE, English (Language and Literature), Mathematics, all three separate sciences, Religious Studies, a foreign language, a humanity (Geography or History), a creative subject, and another free choice from any remaining options. Some students are offered the opportunity to study an additional, twelfth Mathematics qualification, which for most selected students is the Level 2 Certificate in Further Mathematics, but the highest achieving students are instead put forward for the Free Standing Maths Qualification (FSMQ). In recent years, the school has also offered a GCSE in Classical Languages, and History has been offered as two separate GCSEs with students selecting either of Modern History and Ancient History.

In the sixth form, pupils begin by studying four A-Levels, but some choose only to sit exams for three A-Levels. A wide choice of subjects is offered at A-level: English Literature, French, German, Latin, Classical Civilisation, Art, Design and Technology, Music, Geography, History, Economics, Politics, Mathematics, Further Mathematics, Physics, Chemistry, Biology, Religious Studies, Philosophy, Computer Science and P.E. Most combinations of subjects can be accommodated. Students also have the opportunity to take an Extended Project Qualification (EPQ) in the spring term of Year 12. All students participate in a games activity on a Wednesday afternoon every fortnight.

The school year runs from September to July, split across three terms: the autumn term (September to December), the spring term (January to April) and the summer term (April to July). Students receive two weeks off for Christmas and Easter, a six-week summer break, and three "half-term" breaks.

=== Examination ===
Until the establishment of the General Certificate of Education, exams were set once a year by an external examiner(s) appointed by the governors, who reported in writing on the general proficiency of pupils, as well as the condition of the school. A 1902 report by examiner Wormell found that the curriculum was "sufficient to help those few capable of rising to something higher by providing a bridge between elementary school and grammar school". He criticised the absence of German tuition and the fact that more than half the students came "feebly taught from country districts". The headmaster would also submit a written report to the governors.

In 1951, the school adopted the General Certificate of Education, but students were barred from taking any exams before the age of 16, which meant that many students left school without any qualifications because of the sheer necessity of leaving school to contribute to household income. The system became more rational in time, but often pupils were taking O-levels and A-levels simultaneously. As of 2010, the school offers GCSEs to students in the lower school, and AS/A-levels to students in the sixth form. Under Rendall, exam pass rates at A-level increased from 67.5 per cent in 1970, peaking at 95 per cent in 1984 before decreasing slightly to 92 per cent in 1987. O-level/GCSE results have similarly improved, reaching a peak of 88 per cent pass rate in 1978.

== Academic Performance ==
The Judd School performs consistently highly above average in national examinations, with 90% of GCSE entries and 89% of A Level entries achieving A*-B grades in 2019. League tables published by the BBC based on 2008 A Level results rank Judd as the fourth best school in Kent. In its 2022 league table of the best selective schools in the United Kingdom, The Sunday Times ranked The Judd School 18th.

The vast majority of students at the school go on to attend university, and the school has consistently high Oxbridge offer rates.

== Extra-curricular activities ==
School clubs and societies include various language clubs, sport clubs, musical activities, politics and debating societies, a Voluntary Service Unit, Young Enterprise and many others. Some clubs include the classics club, Greek club, chess club, cipher club, geography club, Scrabble club, Chinese culture club, puzzle club, philosophy club, board games club, French film club, squash club and homework club. Students may also participate in the Duke of Edinburgh's Award Scheme. Now defunct school societies have included a Young Farmers Club, Jazz Society, Science Society, Stamp Club, Literary and Debating Society, and the League of Nations Union.

Extra-curricular musical opportunities include: Choir, Junior Singers, Chamber Choir, Judd Brass, Big Bands, String Orchestra, Concert Band, Symphony Orchestra and Junior Orchestra; students give up to 40 concerts per year. Instrumental lessons are available through the school, for which a charge is made. Organised drama at the school began at the latest in 1929, with performances including Richard II and Julius Caesar. Despite the minimum of theatrical equipment, Taylor (1988) notes that "much has been achieved" and at times the headmaster himself took a leading role.

The school cadet corps, a national program now known as the Combined Cadet Force, was formed towards the end of 1917 and 120 cadets were recruited within a month. The governors provided £25 towards their initial expenses, and volunteers contributed haversacks, water bottles, dummy rifles and trips to summer camp. Training initially took place on the Tonbridge School rifle range. By 1952, the number of volunteer cadets had fallen to 90. During the 1970s, numbers averaged about 150 cadets. The school's Combined Cadet Force currently comprises both an Army and a Royal Air Force Section with a total establishment strength of 120 cadets, who meet on Friday afternoons following a full school day. Membership remains voluntary, and boys can join from Year Nine (aged 13–14).

=== Sport ===
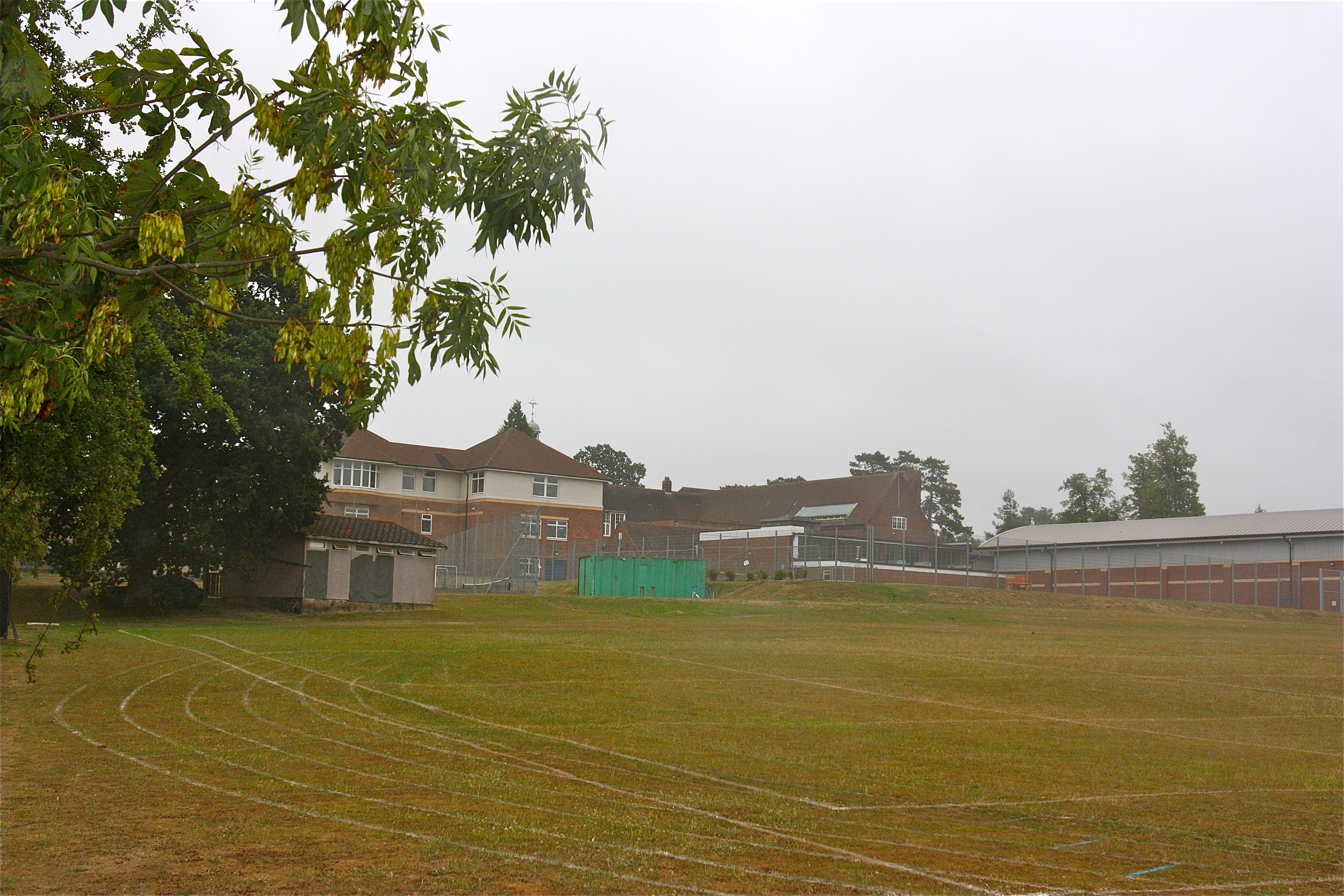
Playing fields to the west of the Brook Street site, with view of the Library Building and the Sports Hall

At lower school level, there are regular games for "A" and "B" teams in most sports, so that many of the students have the chance to represent the school; in Year Seven there are occasionally "C", "D", "E", "F" and "G" team rugby matches. A programme of inter-house competitions, caters for those who are not school team players. The main games are rugby, football, cross-country, and basketball during the winter months, and cricket, tennis and athletics during the summer term. The school features on a national scale in its 4 main sports (rugby, cross country, cricket and athletics) and in 2017 was ranked the 2nd best state school for sport by the School's Sports Magazine.

The school adopted the rugby code of football in 1923, at which time it was played on soccer pitches; the first games against other schools were played during the 1925–26 season, and rugby was played by all students by 1927. The school reached the quarterfinals of the premier national schools rugby competition, the NatWest Schools Cup, in 2017 and 2018. As of 2010, "A" and "B" rugby teams play against local grammar schools. The most important fixture in the Judd sporting calendar is the annual match against The Skinners' School. Boys are often rewarded for their efforts with international tours, and rugby sevens is also played at the school. In the 2008–09 season, the under-15 rugby team advanced to the final of the national schools Daily Mail Cup at Twickenham on 1 April 2009 but lost 11–34 to Millfield. Football had been played at the school since its foundation and in 1908, despite the inadequacy of the school's pitches, was the primary winter game. However, by 1925 rugby was the predominant winter sport, and three years later footballs were banned from the school.

Burgess (2000) notes that The Judd School has a "fine reputation for its cricket teams", and as the primary summer game, the sport remains popular today. The Judd School offers cricket academies from Year Eight (aged 12–13) onwards, with training available all year round. In recent years Judd has found success in County Cup competitions at all age groups.

In both cross country and athletics Judd competes nationally and internationally, winning competitions such as the National Schools' Cup in both sports at junior and intermediate level. The school has won 6 of 10, and the King Henry VIII relays in Coventry. In 2004, the school's cross country team became the first school in a decade to end the dominance of public schools Winchester College and St Albans School at the Knole run in Sevenoaks. The school cross country squad has an annual training camp in Lanzarote in December, which acts as both a reward for effort and a valuable warm-weather training camp in preparation for January's Knole Run. The school holds weekly matches against local schools. School teams compete in other sports such as basketball, tennis and hockey. During the 2020 and 2021 UK COVID-19 lockdowns the school's Cross Country Team organised two virtual charity runs in support of NHS Charities Together and Greenhouse Sports. The student-organised events raised a combined total of £13,578.

== Property ==
=== Stafford House ===
Upon its foundation, when – according to Green (1990) – it was said to be a "temporary expedient", the school was based at Stafford House, in East Street in the centre of Tonbridge. Previously used by private tutor Isaac Fleming in 1878, it was a building whose central urban position was, Taylor (1988) said, a "major asset, and possibly the only one"; Headmaster Bryant "bore its numerous shortcomings, its bricked ambience and grasslessness". Positioned in a narrow street and originally designed for 20 boarders, traffic noise, awkward arrangement and low pitch of the classrooms and the distance of the school from its playing fields made the building far from ideal. It underwent repairs and alterations to the value of £300, carried out by a local builder; several partition walls were knocked down to form larger rooms, although this still restricted the bench length in even the widest of the rooms to 9-foot (2.7 m), and 18 pupils. The floor of the main schoolroom was restored and lavatory closets and urinals were installed. Later, a carpentry shed was placed in the yard, and a "Mr Russell" was appointed as its first occupant in October 1889. "Mr Beeching's field" was used – at what Taylor (1988) considered "an extortionate sum" – for games, but it was unavailable for four months of the year when it was used to grow hay. Beeching ended this arrangement in April 1889, at which time the school used the 5-acre (2.0 ha) YMCA field, for £20 per year. In June of that year, a shed to house cricket equipment was constructed at the cost of £13/10s. It was soon decided that there was a need for more "wholesome" surroundings, and it was generally accepted that south Tonbridge would be more suitable for the development of a new school.

=== Brook Street site ===
After Bloodshotts field (the current location of Tonbridge Grammar School) was rejected as an inferior site, "Mr Deacon's Field" in Haysden Lane (now Brook Street) was acquired from Sir Edmund Hardinge's trustees for £240 per acre, a total of £2,059. At one point owned by Sir Andrew Judd, the site consisted of 8 acres (3.2 ha) of land, which according to Taylor (1988) sloped "gently from the road to the rear of the site". Plans, by Campbell Jones, were submitted to the headmaster in July 1883; they included a covered playground, red-bricked buildings incorporating local sandstone, Broseley roof tiles and a small basement housing a boiler. The construction was carried out by Messrs Turners of Watford, and total construction costs were £8,637. (Note: Other estimates put the aggregate spending, including land, buildings, and equipment at £12,000.) Nearly two years later, on 27 April 1895, the Foundation Stone was laid, at which time Lewis Boyd Sebastian, Master of The Skinners' Company performed a small ceremony. Opened in March 1896, the building featured an oak Neo-Georgian fleche surmounting an Oregon pine hammer-beamed roof. The principal entrance was carved by Messrs Lornie of London and featured shields bearing the coat of arms of Sir Andrew Judd and the company, the only architectural flourish allowed by the low budget.

In addition to the "schoolroom", which was larger than the Town Public Hall, the building consisted of a dining hall (cum gymnasium), the masters common room to the east and a block of six classrooms to the west. The headmaster's house was completed at the same time as the main school building, and had five bedrooms wired with electric bells, and a bathroom plumbed with hot and cold water. In November 1920, an organ was built at a cost of over £1,000, and placed in the schoolroom as a memorial to the old boys and masters who died in the First World War. A new gymnasium was constructed after a 1956 survey deemed its predecessor economically irreparable. Accompanied by the construction of three hard tennis courts, it was opened by Sir Benjamin Brodie in 1958, but lacked adjoining changing rooms, washing facilities and office facilities for members of the physical education staff.

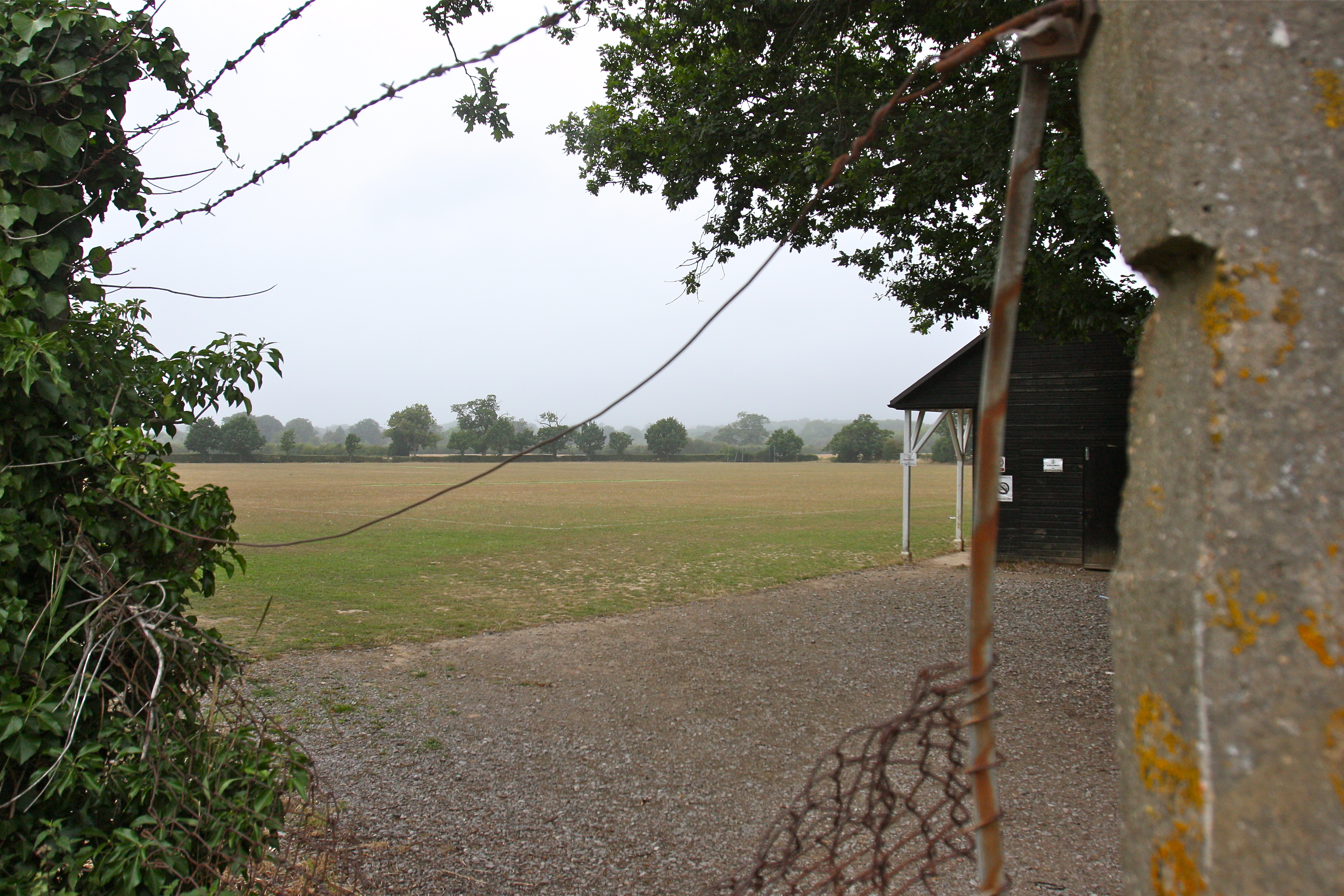
Yeoman's fields, a 10-minute walk from the school

Now known as "Lawton's", 10 Brook Street was purchased during the early 1970s using funds provided by the Kent Education Committee, after whose chairman the building is now named. There is now a garden by the side of lawtons', which students spend time to relax and play with their friends. A £2 million classroom and technology building (the "Cohen Building"), together with two new science laboratories, was opened in 1991. A new music centre, financed by voluntary donations, was opened in 1995 and a schoolroom annexe followed in 1997. The most recent developments are a library/classroom building in 2002, a new sports hall in 2003 and an all-weather pitch in 2006. The Atwell Building, formerly known as the "Maths-Geography Block", opened in 2009 after suffering delays after the original building contractor went out of business. There has been a new school building constructed, providing four new Biology labs and a new canteen to expand on the outdated old canteen in the main school building. After delays, it was completed in Easter 2017, entitled the "Ashton Building", and is currently in use. There are new pitches at Vizards that were officially completed in January 2017. There are several grass pitches as well as one of the largest 3G pitches in the UK. The school grounds have sufficient space for two rugby pitches and training grids in the winter months, or a 200-metre (660 ft) running track, and a cricket ground (with nets) for summer. There are also two asphalt tennis courts, an all weather pitch and an air rifle range used by the school's Combined Cadet Force. By 2018, the Guy Hands Library had been added. A new development the new Sixth Form Centre with its 200m2 study area, offices, meeting rooms and a tremendous view is under construction.

=== Yeoman's fields ===
The "Yeoman's fields" site was purchased after a government inspection in 1933 recommended the school seek more land. The site consists of 6.8 acres (2.8 ha) of level, dry land that requires little conditioning, making it ideal for the full-sized rugby pitches, which came into regular use in 1935. Previously part of meadlow land termed the "Townlands", it was purchased by the Kent Education Committee from the Town Wardens and soon equipped with hedges, lavatories and a pavilion. In 1939, trenches were dug in the field in preparation for the Second World War.

On 26 April 2016, it was revealed that the "Yeoman's fields" site had been sold to help fund a new set of playing fields, which are situated near Lower Haysden Lane at the "Vizards" site. The new playing fields tackled the issue of increasing student numbers.

== Notable alumni ==
Arts

- Timothy Allen (born 1971), photojournalist
- Sir Humphrey Burton, BBC Head of Music
- Rob Crilly (born 1973), journalist and author
- Angus Fairhurst, artist
- Taylor Fawcett, actor from Life of Riley
- Bernard Hailstone, royal portrait painter
- Harold Hailstone, cartoonist
- Jack Holden (actor), actor
- George Henry Horton (born 1993), filmmaker
- Rob Luft (born 1993), jazz guitarist and composer
- James Miller, (born 1976), British novelist and academic
- David Moule-Evans, composer
- Geoffrey Paterson (born 1983), conductor

Military

- Fergus Anckorn (born 1918), magician and soldier
- Neville Duke, a Second World War fighter pilot
- Donald Hodge, one of the last surviving veterans of the First World War
- Terence Lewin, Chief of the Defence Staff and Admiral of the Fleet
- Sir Clive Loader, Air Chief Marshal
- Richard Moth, former Bishop of the Forces and current Archbishop of Westminster
- Stuart Skeates, (born 1966), major general and former Commandant of the Royal Military Academy Sandhurst

Science

- Richard Dixon, British chemist, fellow of the Royal Society, and winner of the Rumford Medal
- Cecil Powell (1903–1969), Nobel prize winner in Physics
- Rob Warner (academic), (born 1956), British academic

Sports

- Luke Baldwin, rugby player
- David Fulton, former captain of the Kent County Cricket Club
- Angus Hall (born 2005), rugby player
- Ekansh Singh (born 2006), Cricketer at the Kent Cricket Club
- Harry Kendall (born 1996), athlete
- Anton Matusevich (born 2001), British tennis player
- Tom Probert (born 1986), cricketer
- Martin Purdy, professional rugby player
- Zak Skinner (born 1998), athlete
- James Whiteaker (born 1998), athlete
- Michael Willard, cricketer

Other

- Torsten Bell, Labour Party politician
- William Cockcroft (born c. 1950), Chief Scout Commissioner
- John Gathercole, (1937–2010), Archdeacon of Dudley
- Max Godden, (died 2000), Archdeacon of Lewes
- Tom Greatrex (born 1974), MP for Rutherglen and Hamilton West
- Guy Hands (born 1959), financier
- Howard Riddle, lawyer and former Chief Magistrate for England and Wales
- Tim Stanley, journalist
- Ronald Williams (1906–79), Bishop of Leicester
- Stewart Wood, Baron Wood of Anfield, Member of the House of Lords
