= Bishop of Tonbridge =

Position in the Church of England

The Bishop of Tonbridge is an episcopal title used by a suffragan bishop of the Church of England Diocese of Rochester in the Province of Canterbury, England. The title takes its name after Tonbridge, a market town in Kent; the see was erected under the Suffragans Nomination Act 1888 by Order in Council dated 11 September 1958. The bishop assists the diocesan Bishop of Rochester as well as having a particular ministry in the Archdeaconry of Tonbridge.

The current bishop is Simon Burton-Jones, since his consecration on 3 July 2018.

== List of bishops ==
Bishops of Tonbridge
| From | Until | Incumbent | Notes |
|---|---|---|---|
| 1959 | 1968 | Russell White | (1896–1979) |
| 1968 | 1972 | David Halsey | (1919–2009). Translated to Carlisle |
| 1973 | 1982 | Philip Goodrich | (1929–2001). Translated to Worcester |
| 1982 | 1993 | David Bartleet | (1929–2002) |
| 1993 | 2002 | Brian Smith | (b. 1943). Translated to Edinburgh |
| 2002 | 2015 | Brian Castle | (b. 1949) Retired 31 October 2015. |
| 2015 | 2018 | vacant | |
| 2018 | present | Simon Burton-Jones | (b. 1962) Consecrated 3 July 2018. |
