= Brian Smith (bishop) =

Scottish Episcopal bishop

The Right Reverend Brian Smith
- Bishop Emeritus of Edinburgh
- Church: Scottish Episcopal Church
- Diocese: Diocese of Edinburgh
- In office: 2001 – 15 August 2011 (retired)
- Predecessor: Richard Holloway
- Successor: John Armes
- Previous posts: Bishop of Tonbridge (1993–2001); Archdeacon of Craven (1987–1993)

Orders
- Ordination: 1972 (deacon); 1973 (priest)
- Consecration: 1993

Personal details
- Born: 15 August 1943 (age 83) Edinburgh, Scotland
- Denomination: Anglican
- Parents: Arthur and Doris Smith
- Spouse: Elizabeth Hutchinson (m. 1970)
- Children: 2
- Profession: Bishop
- Education: University of Edinburgh; University of Cambridge

Brian Arthur Smith (born 15 August 1943) was the Bishop of Edinburgh in the Scottish Episcopal Church.

== Life and career ==
=== Early life and education ===
Smith was born in Edinburgh and educated at George Heriot's School, Edinburgh He attended the University of Edinburgh, graduating with an MA in Mental Philosophy in 1966. At graduation he was awarded the Skirving Scholarship and Gold Medal in Moral Philosophy. He then moved to the University of Cambridge to study theology as a member of Westcott House and Fitzwilliam College, Cambridge. Following his graduation in theology (MA) he was elected to a Lady Kay Scholarship by Jesus College, Cambridge and from there later graduated as Master of Letters (MLitt).

=== Ordained ministry ===
Smith was ordained deacon in 1973 in the Diocese of Oxford. He began his ordained ministry with a curacy at Church of All Saints, Cuddesdon, with responsibilities for teaching Christian doctrine at Cuddesdon College. Following the merger of Cuddesdon College with Ripon Hall, Oxford, Smith became director of studies and then senior tutor in the united college - Ripon College Cuddesdon. In 1979 he moved to the Diocese of Wakefield taking up responsibility for the parish of St John the Baptist in the Wilderness, Cragg Vale, alongside responsibility for the in-service training of clergy in the diocese. To this was later added responsibility in the field of lay training. He became director of training in the Diocese of Wakefield. During this time Smith continued to exercise responsibilities as examiner in Christian doctrine for the General Ordination Examinations of the Church of England, and was an inspector (later senior inspector) of the church's theological colleges and courses. In 1985 he was elected to the General Synod of the Church of England, by the clergy of the Wakefield diocese. In 1987 he was appointed Archdeacon of Craven in the Diocese of Bradford, and in 1993 was appointed Bishop of Tonbridge in the Diocese of Rochester. He was translated to the episcopal see of Edinburgh, in the Scottish Episcopal Church, in 2001.

He retired as Bishop of Edinburgh on 15 August 2011.

During his ministry Smith had occasion to pay several visits to Africa (Ghana, Sudan, Zimbabwe, Nigeria, Swaziland, S Africa, Botswana) and was instrumental in establishing a link between the Diocese of Edinburgh and the Diocese of Cape Coast in Ghana. He was also actively involved in the early days of the Porvoo Agreement between British Anglicans and Scandinavian and Baltic Lutherans.

Smith was a director of the Scottish Journal of Theology (1977–81), vice-chairman of the Northern Ordination Course (1985–93), chairman of Churches Together in Kent (1999-2001) and continues to be a vice-president of Modern Church (2009–present). He served on the Scotland Committee of UNESCO (2008-2015) and on UNESCO UK Memory of the World Committee (2009-2017). He was a director of Waverley Care (2002-2011), a governor of Loretto School (2012-2017) and a trustee of St Mary's Music School (2009-2017). In the years 2013 and 2015 he acted a voluntary lecturer in theology at St Augustine's Theological School, Botswana. In 2017 he was invited to join the business committee of the general council of the University of Edinburgh. On 10 July 2018 he was awarded an Honorary Doctorate of Divinity by the University of Edinburgh.

=== Personal life ===
Smith lists his personal interests as snorkelling, short-wave radio listening, and browsing in junk shops. He is married with two daughters and has three grandsons.

=== Honours ===
He was created Companion of the Roll of Honour of the Memorial of Merit of King Charles the Martyr in 2017.
