= Bromley =

Town of Greater London

Coordinates: 51.4070°N 0.0210°E

- Bromley town high street

- Location within Greater London
- Population: 97,540
- OS grid reference: TQ405695
  - Charing Cross: 9.3 mi (15.0 km) NW
- London borough: Bromley
- Ceremonial county: Greater London
- Region: London
- Country: England
- Sovereign state: United Kingdom
- Post town: BROMLEY
- Postcode district: BR1, BR2
- Dialling code: 020
- Police: Metropolitan
- Fire: London
- Ambulance: London
- UK Parliament: Bromley and Biggin Hill
- London Assembly: Bexley and Bromley

Bromley is a large town in Greater London, England, within the London Borough of Bromley. It is 9 1/2 miles (15 kilometres) southeast of Charing Cross, and had an estimated population of 97,540 as of 2021.

Originally part of Kent, Bromley became a market town, chartered in 1158. Its location on a coaching route and the opening of a railway station in 1858 were key to its development and the shift from an agrarian village to an urban town. As part of the growth of London's conurbation in the 20th century, Bromley Town significantly increased in population and was incorporated as a municipal borough in 1903 and became part of the London Borough of Bromley in 1965. Bromley today forms a major retail and commercial centre. It is identified in the London Plan as one of the 13 metropolitan centres of Greater London.

== History ==
Bromley is first recorded in an Anglo-Saxon charter of 862 as Bromleag and means 'woodland clearing where broom grows'. It shares this Old English etymology with Great Bromley in eastern Essex, but not with the Bromley in the East End of London.

The history of Bromley is closely connected with the See of Rochester. In AD 862 Ethelbert, the King of Kent, granted land to form the Manor of Bromley. In 1185 Bromley Palace was built by Gilbert Glanvill, Bishop of Rochester. Pilgrims came to the town to visit St. Blaise's Well. The Palace was held by the Bishops until 1845, when Coles Child, a wealthy local merchant and philanthropist, purchased Bromley Palace and became lord of the manor. The town was an important coaching stop on the way to Hastings from London, and the Royal Bell Hotel (which has recently been reopened as of January 2026 and is just off Market Square) is referred to in Jane Austen's Pride and Prejudice. It was a quiet rural village until the arrival of the railway in 1858 in Shortlands, which led to rapid growth, and outlying suburban districts such as Bickley (which later overflowed into Bromley Common) were developed to accommodate those wishing to live so conveniently close to London.

Bromley, also known as Bromley St Peter and St Paul, formed an ancient parish in the Bromley and Beckenham hundred and the Sutton-at-Hone lathe of Kent. In 1840 it became part of the expanded Metropolitan Police District. The parish adopted the Local Government Act 1858 and a local board was formed in 1867. The board was reconstituted as Bromley Urban District Council in 1894 and the parish became Bromley Urban District. It formed part of the London Traffic Area from 1924 and the London Passenger Transport Area from 1933. In 1934, as part of a county review order, the borough was expanded by taking in 1,894 acres (766 hectares) from the disbanded Bromley Rural District; an area including parts of the parishes of Farnborough, Hayes, Keston and West Wickham. Bromley became part of the newly created Greater London in 1965, in the new London Borough of Bromley.

== Governance ==
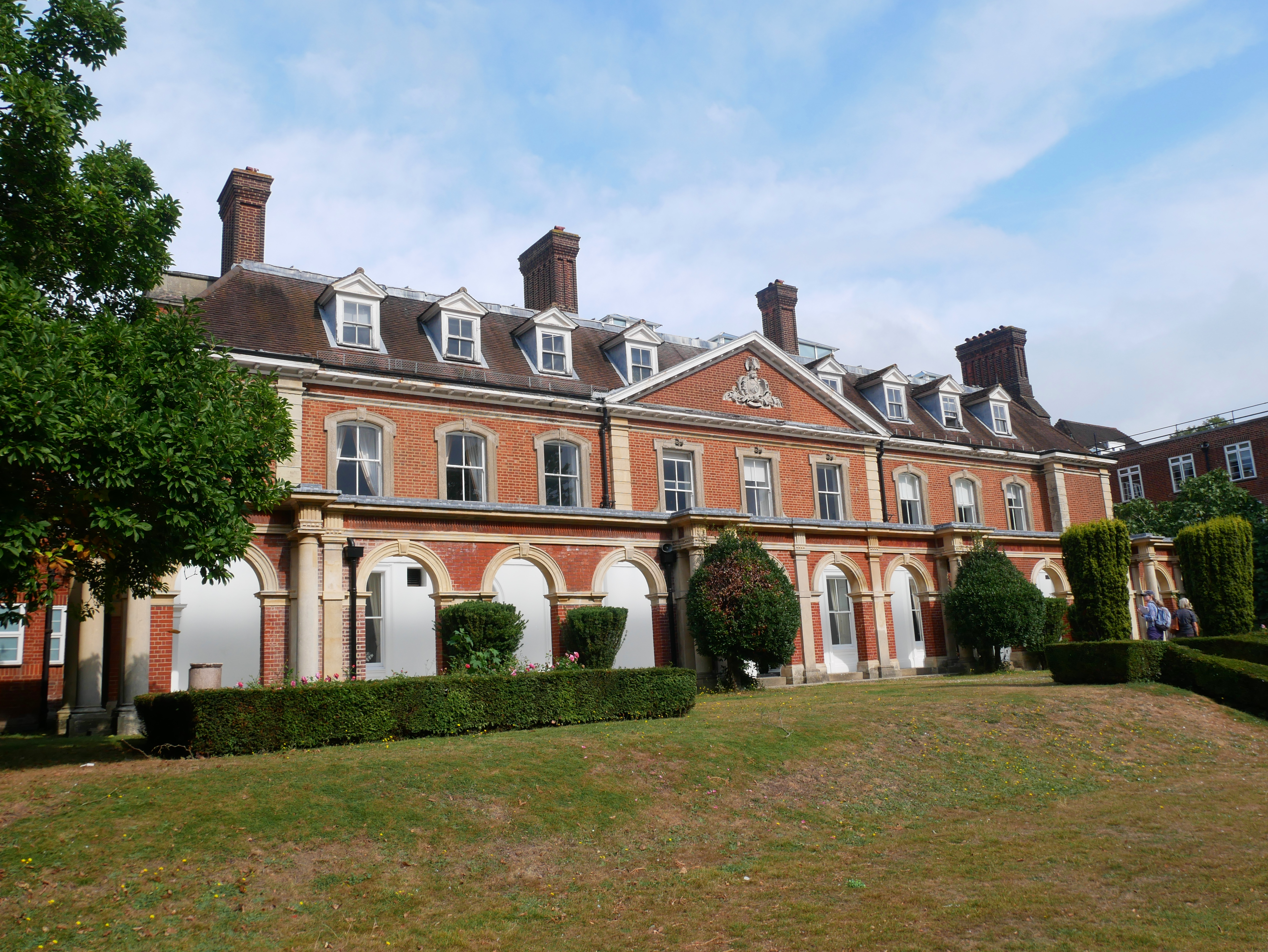
The Grade II listed Bromley Palace

Bromley forms part of the Bromley and Biggin Hill Parliament constituency. The current MP is Peter Fortune. Thomas Turrell is the London Assembly member for the Bexley and Bromley constituency, in which the town is located. This post was previously held by Fortune.

Bromley's most prominent MP was the former Conservative prime minister, Harold Macmillan.

Bromley is part of the Bromley Town ward for elections to Bromley London Borough Council.

== Climate ==
Climate in this area has mild differences between highs and lows. The Köppen Climate Classification subtype for this climate is "Cfb". (Marine West Coast Climate/Oceanic climate).

== Economy ==
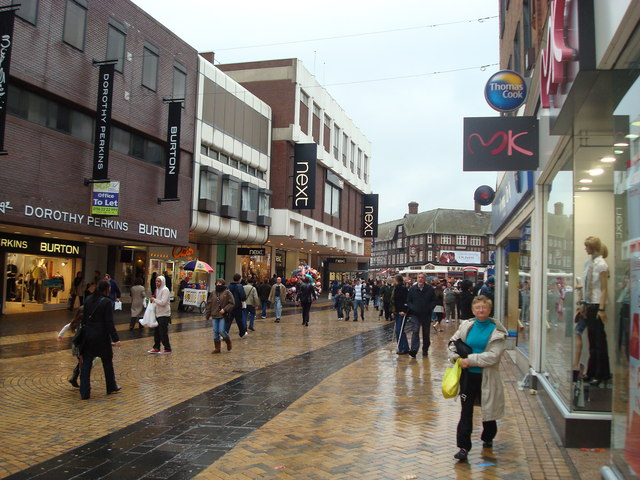
High Street, Bromley

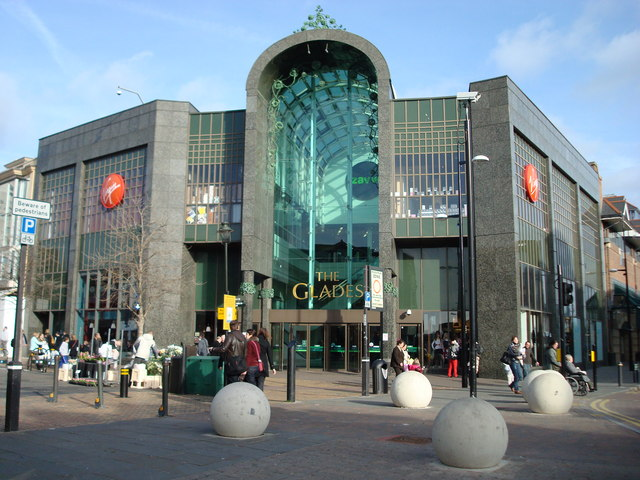
The Glades Shopping Centre opened in 1991

Bromley is one of the major metropolitan centres identified in the London Plan. Bromley had one of the highest gross disposable household incomes (GDHI) in the UK, at £27,169 in 2018.

Bromley was ranked fourth in Greater London by Retail Footprint in 2005, behind the West End, Croydon and Kingston upon Thames. Bromley competes with both Croydon and the Bluewater centre in Dartford as a shopping destination.

=== Bromley High Street ===
The town has a large retail area, including a pedestrianised High Street and The Glades centre, the main shopping mall, which has a catchment of 1.3 million people. Development at the nearby St. Mark's Square has seen further restaurants and a cinema established.

Bromley High Street is also the location for the Bromley Charter Market, which runs on a Tuesday, Thursday and Saturday. King John granted a charter for the Market to be held every Tuesday in 1205, with Henry VI revising this charter to every Thursday in 1447. The Market sells food and confectionery items, clothing and other goods like jewellery.

== Transport ==
Bromley North railway station, a Grade II listed structure

Bromley South station.

=== Rail ===
Bromley is served by two main rail stations. Bromley South provides National Rail services to London Victoria (non stop, semi fast via Denmark Hill and stopping services via Herne Hill), London Blackfriars via Catford, Orpington, Sevenoaks via Swanley, Ramsgate via Chatham, Dover Priory via Chatham & Canterbury East and to Ashford International via Maidstone East.

Bromley North provides shuttle services to Grove Park, where onward connections can be made for services to London Charing Cross & London Cannon Street via Lewisham.

Finally, Shortlands railway station serves primarily residential areas immediately southwest of the town centre. Being one stop west of Bromley South, Southeastern and Thameslink services connect the station to London Victoria and London Blackfriars.

=== Buses ===
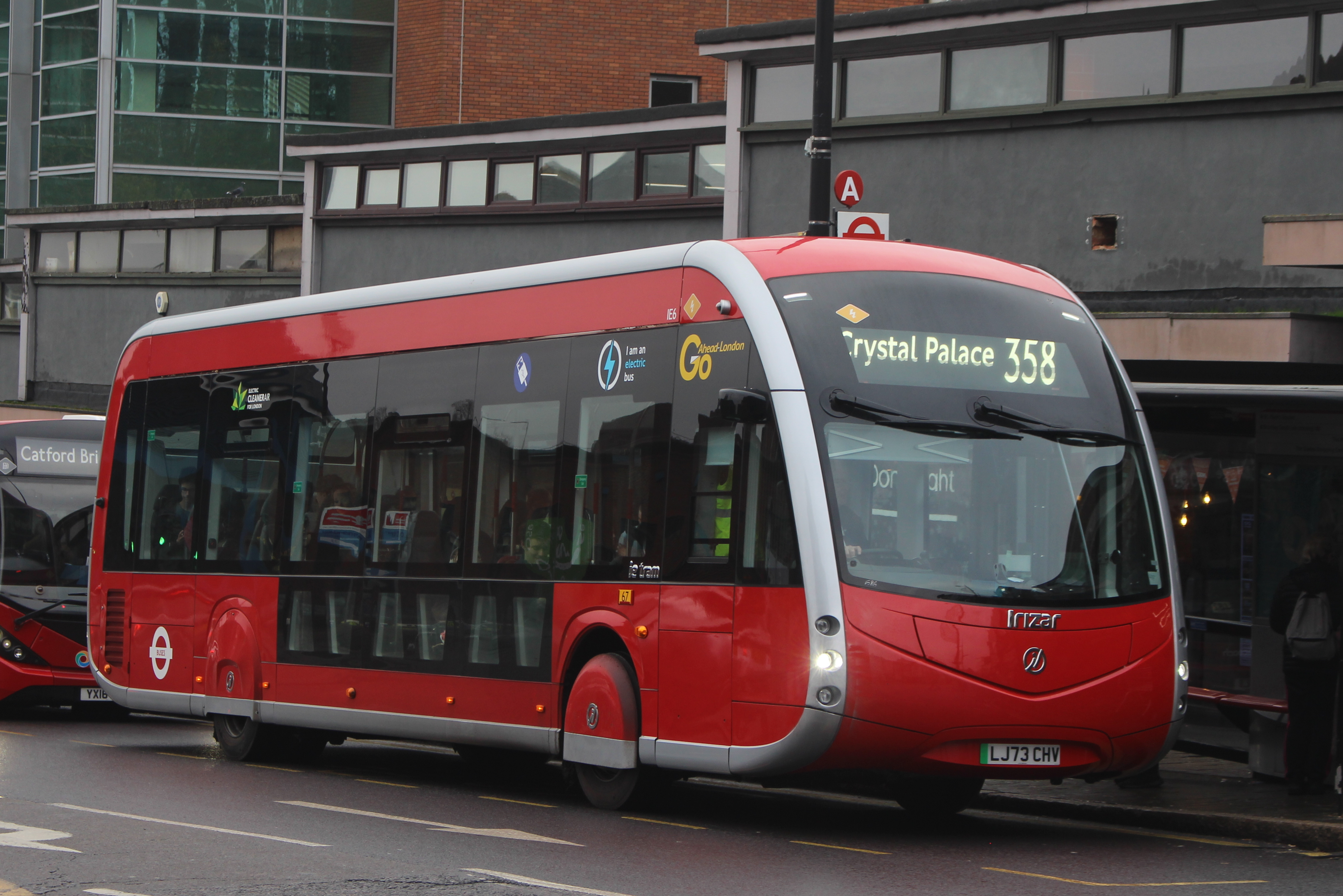
Metrobus 358 in Bromley. Route coninues to Shortlands, Beckenham and Crystal Palace.

Bromley is served by London Buses routes 61, 119, 126, 138, 146, 162, 208, 227, 246, 261, 269, 314, 320, 336, 352, 354, 358, 367, 638, N3, N199, SL3 and SL5. These connect it with areas including Beckenham, Bexley, Bexleyheath, Biggin Hill, Catford, Chislehurst, Croydon, Crystal Palace, Downham, Elmers End, Eltham, Grove Park, Hayes, Lee Green, Lewisham, Locksbottom, Mottingham, New Addington, Orpington, Penge, Petts Wood, Shortlands, Sidcup, West Wickham & Westerham.

== Culture ==
=== Festivals ===
Since May 1929, Bromley has had an annual festival of "dance, drama and comedy" in and around the town's venues. The South London Film Festival has been hosted annually in Bromley since 2022.

The large open spaces have lent themselves to outdoor concerts, festivals and outdoor screenings, as well in the venues such as Norman Park, Hayes Farm, Beckenham Place Park and Croydon Road recreation ground.

=== Theatres ===
Churchill Theatre building to the right.

Bromley has a number of theatres in the borough, in the town centre there are three, a professional, the Churchill Theatre, an amateur, the Bromley Little Theatre (close to Bromley North railway station) and an outdoor amphitheatre located in "Church House Gardens" behind the Churchill Theatre.

The Churchill Theatre was opened on 19 July 1977 by the Prince of Wales, and seats 781. It is run on a contract currently held by HQ Theatres Ltd acting as both a receiving and producing house, with productions often transferring to the West End or touring nationally. Recent tours have included: An Inspector Calls (2024) and Fawlty Towers (2025).

=== Library ===
Bromley has a central library in the same building as the Churchill Theatre with a large book stock, Internet and wifi access, reference library and local studies department. It functions as the central library of the broader Bromley Borough Libraries Service, but is scheduled to be moved to another location on Bromley High Street as part of a major redevelopment. The new location is planned to open in 2026 with dedicated study and meeting areas and expanded children’s spaces.

Other smaller libraries include the Burnt Ash Library, near the Sundridge Park area of Bromley, which was refurbished and reopened in February 2025 with improved lighting, accessible toilets, a better children’s area, and a new heating system as part of the borough’s wider library upgrade programme.

=== Cinema ===
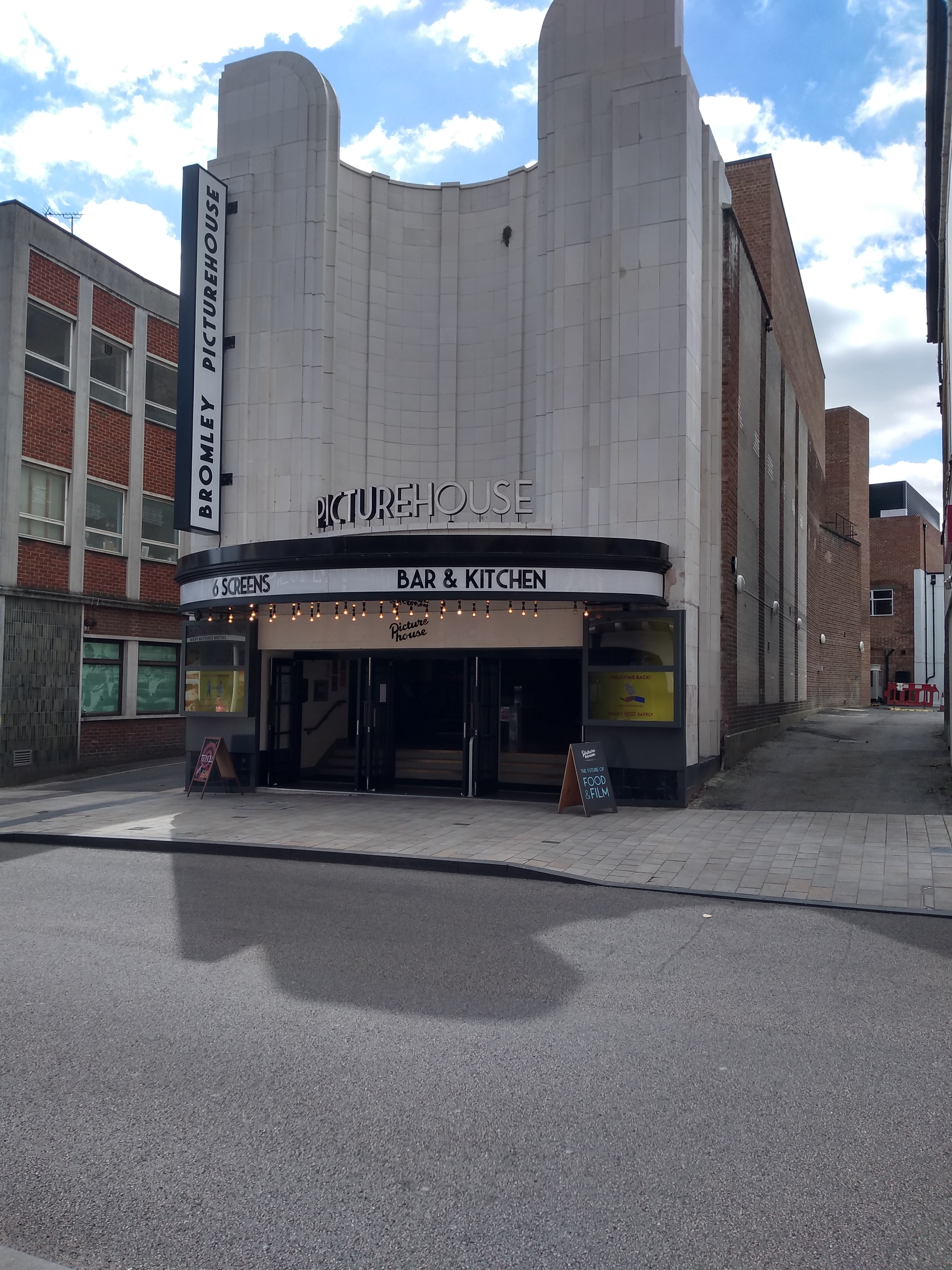
Bromley Picturehouse cinema

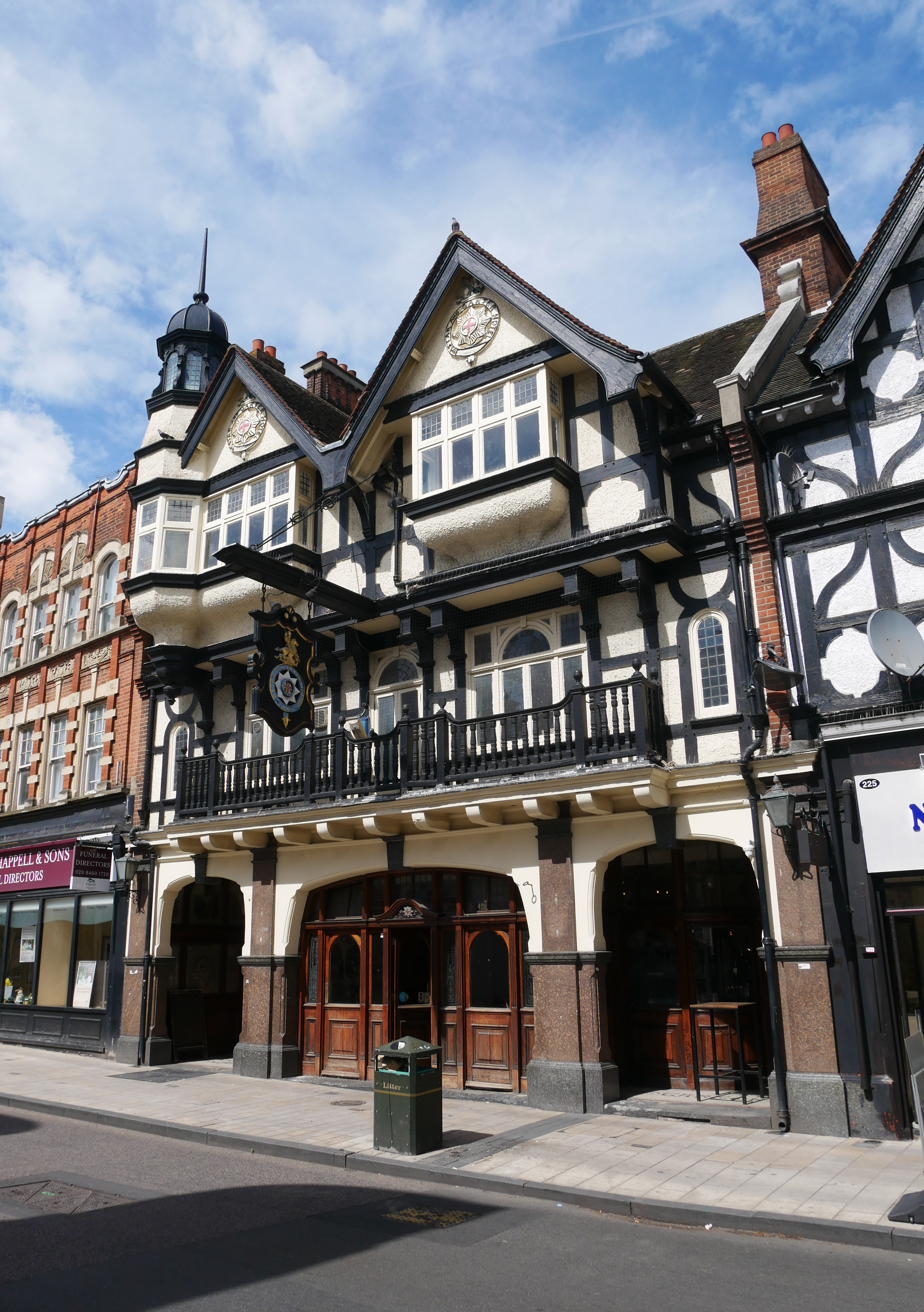
The Star and Garter, a Grade II listed pub in Bromley

Bromley Picturehouse was opened in June 2019 in the previous Empire theatre. The cinema closed on 1 August 2024.

Vue Cinemas own a nine-screen cinema, which is part of the Bromley South Central scheme at St Mark's Square, opened on 28 November 2018.

=== Dance ===
Bromley has its own team of Morris dancers, The Ravensbourne Morris Men, founded in 1947 as a post-war revival team following an inaugural meeting at the then Jean's Café, which was located opposite Bromley South Station.

=== Civic Society ===
Bromley Civic Society is a civic society for the historic centre of Bromley. It is a founder member of Civic Voice. It seeks to educate the public about the community's history and to preserve historical sites.

=== Popular culture ===
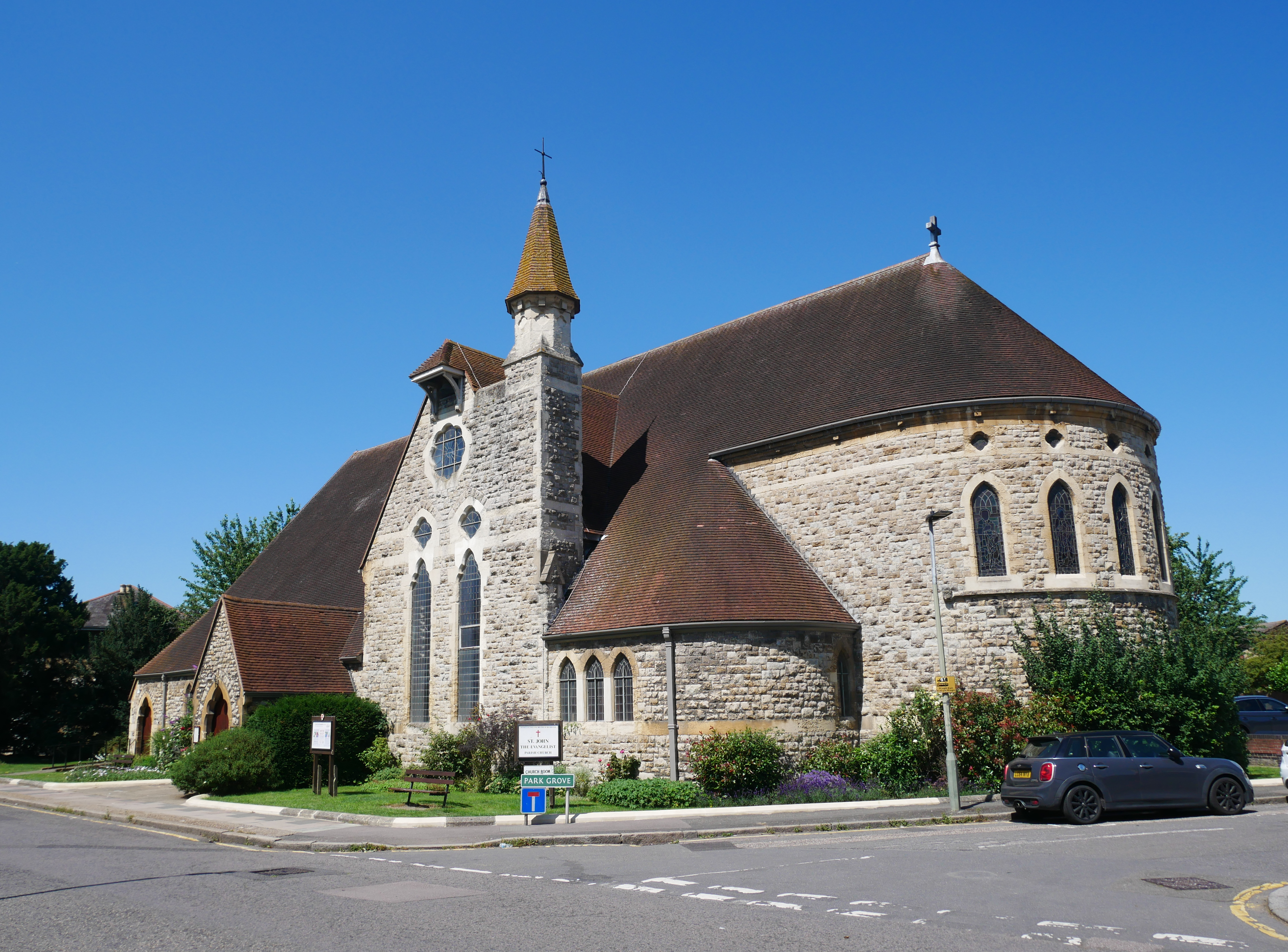
The Church of Saint John the Evangelist in Bromley, built in 1880 and now Grade II listed

In the famous Monty Python "Spam" sketch Bromley was stated to be the location of the fictional Green Midget Café, where every item on the menu was composed of spam in varying degrees. In another Monty Python sketch, it was stated that all seven continents are visible from the top of the Kentish Times building in Bromley.

The Bromley Contingent was the name given to the entourage that followed the Sex Pistols and helped popularise the punk movement. It was so called because many of its members were from Bromley, some of whom later became famous as musicians in their own right, like Siouxsie Sioux and Billy Idol.

The 2018 comedy film, The Bromley Boys is set in Bromley and surroundings in the late 1960s and early 1970s. Based on a real-life memoir by Dave Roberts about following Bromley F.C., it includes many scenes filmed locally, although Crockenhill F.C. was used as a substitute for the Hayes Lane stadium.

Guitarist Billy Jenkins, born in Bromley, released an album titled "Sounds like Bromley" in 1982 and another in 1997 titled "Still Sounds Like Bromley". In a BBC Radio 3 interview he said that "if Kent is the Garden of England then Bromley is one of the compost heaps". He then moved to Lewisham.

=== Media ===
Local news is provided by the Bromley Times.

== Sport and leisure ==
=== Football ===
The town has one Women's Super League club (London City Lionesses), one League One club (Bromley F.C., promoted from League Two in 2026), and two Non-League football clubs (Greenwich Borough F.C. and Petts Wood & Holmesdale F.C.).

Bromley F.C. and London City both play their home games at the Hayes Lane Stadium; as did Cray Wanderers F.C. from 1998 until 2024. The latter club is claimed to be the oldest football club in what is today Greater London. Greenwich Borough and Petts Wood & Holmesdale both play at Oakley Road.

=== Rugby ===
Five rugby clubs in Bromley are, Old Elthamians RFC (a National League 2 side), Park House FC (established in 1883), Bromley RFC (founded in 1886), Beckenham RFC (established in 1894), and Beccehamians RFC (founded in 1933) which plays competitive rugby at Sparrows Den at the bottom of Corkscrew Hill in nearby West Wickham.

=== Cricket ===
Bromley Cricket Club was founded in 1820, but evidence of cricket being played in Bromley dates to 1735. Bromley CC has a significant success record, with 9 Kent Cricket League championship titles to their name. Bromley field four senior teams. Three compete in the Kent Cricket League (a designated ECB Premier League) and one plays in the British Tamil Cricket League. They also have an established junior training section that play competitive cricket in the North Kent Junior League.

== Education ==
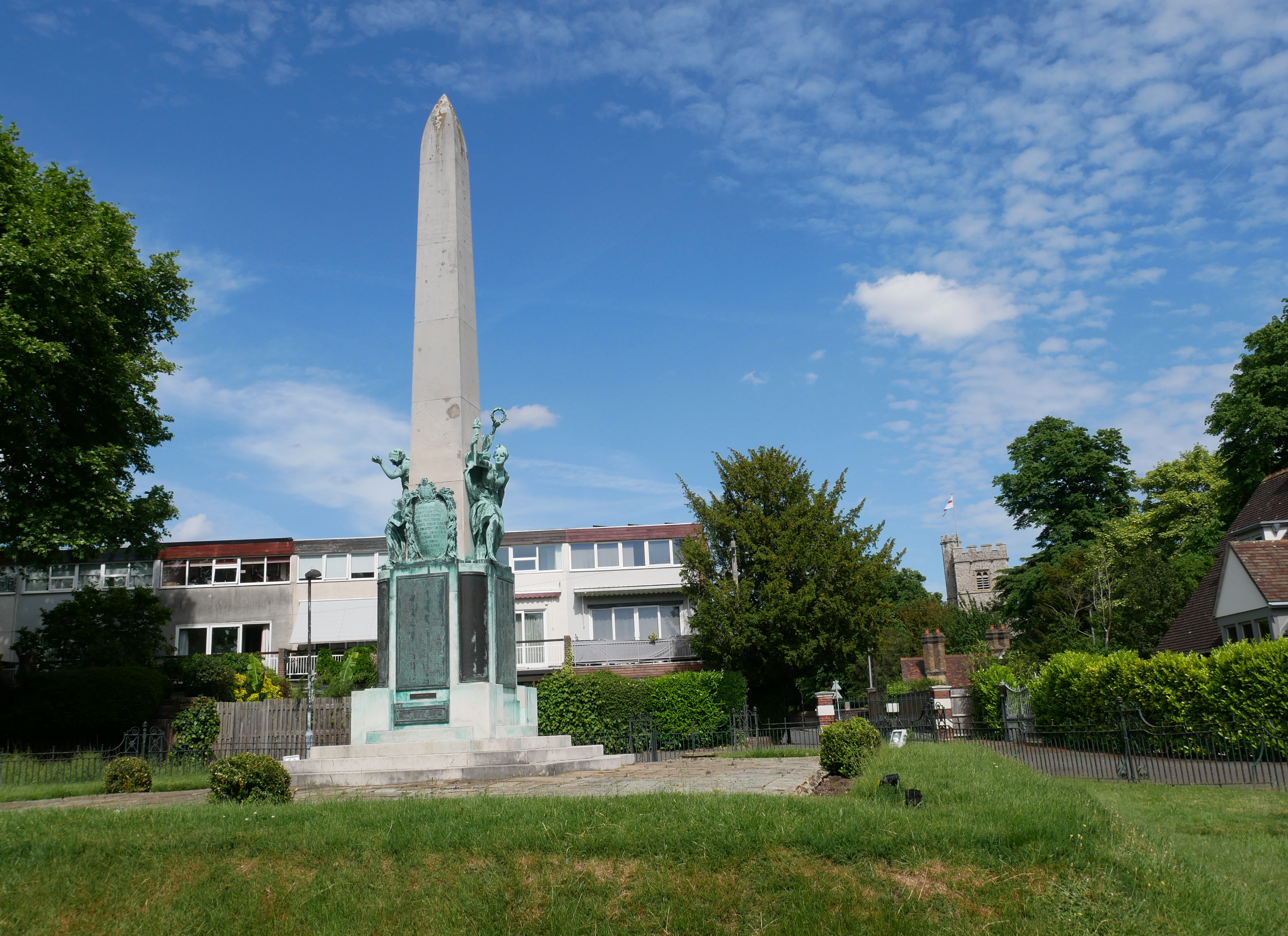
The Grade II listed war memorial in Bromley

Bromley has numerous schools, and is home to Bromley College of Further & Higher Education. There are two specialist Media Arts Schools, Hayes School and The Ravensbourne School. Bishop Justus School is a specialist Music College. It also has the Ravens Wood and Darrick Wood Schools. There are many independent schools within the London Borough of Bromley, including Eltham College (in the nearby area of Mottingham – within the borough of Bromley and near the London Borough of Lewisham) and Bromley High (situated in the nearby area of Bickley - also within the borough of Bromley).

== Demography ==
Bromley town as a whole, including the surrounding area, its neighbourhoods and villages, is formed of six wards for the 2021 census:

- Bickley and Sundridge (17,766)
- Bromley Common and Holwood (18,781)
- Bromley Town (15,400)
- Hayes and Coney Hall (15,908)
- Plaistow (13,478)
- Shortlands and Park Langley (16,207)

The 2021 U.K. census reported the entire borough of Bromley overall had a population 329,991.

=== Life expectancy ===
The life expectancy in Bromley Town ward (which covers the town centre) was 79.3 years for males and 83.7 years for females, during 2009–2013. The highest in the town were in Shortlands: 86.1 years for males and 88.1 years for females. The lowest for both genders was in Plaistow and Sundridge: 77.5 and 82.1 years respectively.

=== Ethnic groups ===
According to the 2021 census, ethnically the Bromley town ward was 70.1% White, 54.0% were White British, White Irish 1.7%, Roma 0.4% and 14.0% Other White. Asians were 12.8%, Black were 7.4%, mixed 6.7% and other were 3.0%.

Bromley Town (ward) 2021
Ethnic group	Population	%
All usual residents	15,396	100.0
White	10,802	70.1
White British	8,312	54.0
Other White	2,155	14.0
Asian	1,969	12.8
Black	1,137	7.4
Mixed, Multiple	1,031	6.7
Other ethnic group	457	3.0

Prior data before the current census, Bromley Town, 18.5% of the population was of minority ethnicity. The highest in the town was 19.3% in Plaistow and Sundridge, and the lowest was 8.3% in Hayes and Coney Hall.

=== House prices ===
The median house price in Bromley Town ward was £327,000 in 2014, compared to £295,444 in Plaistow and Sundridge, and £480,000 in Bickley. 37% of houses in Bickley were detached, more than other wards. In all wards, over 60% of houses were owned by households, peaking at 88.2% in Hayes and Coney Hall. In 2020, the average cost of a house was £519,619.

== Landmarks ==
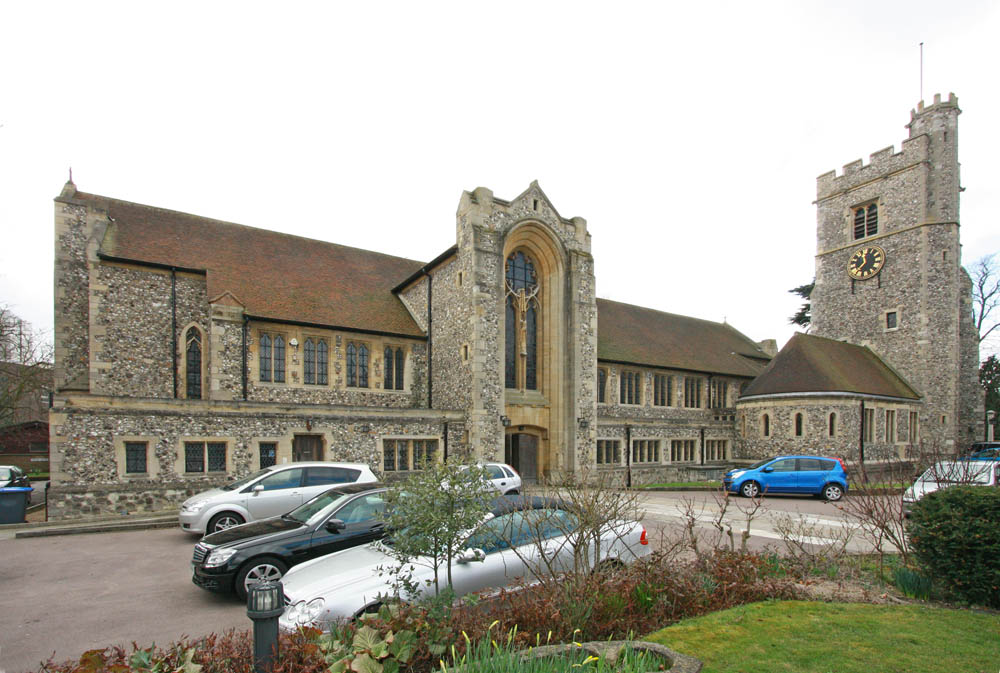
St Peter and St Paul

The parish church of St Peter and St Paul stands on Church Road. It was largely destroyed by German bombing on 16 April 1941 and rebuilt in the 1950s incorporating the medieval tower and reusing much of the flint and fragments of the original stone building. The most noteworthy historic building is Bromley College, London Road. The central public open spaces are; Queen's Gardens, Martin's Hill, Church House Gardens, Library Gardens and College Green.

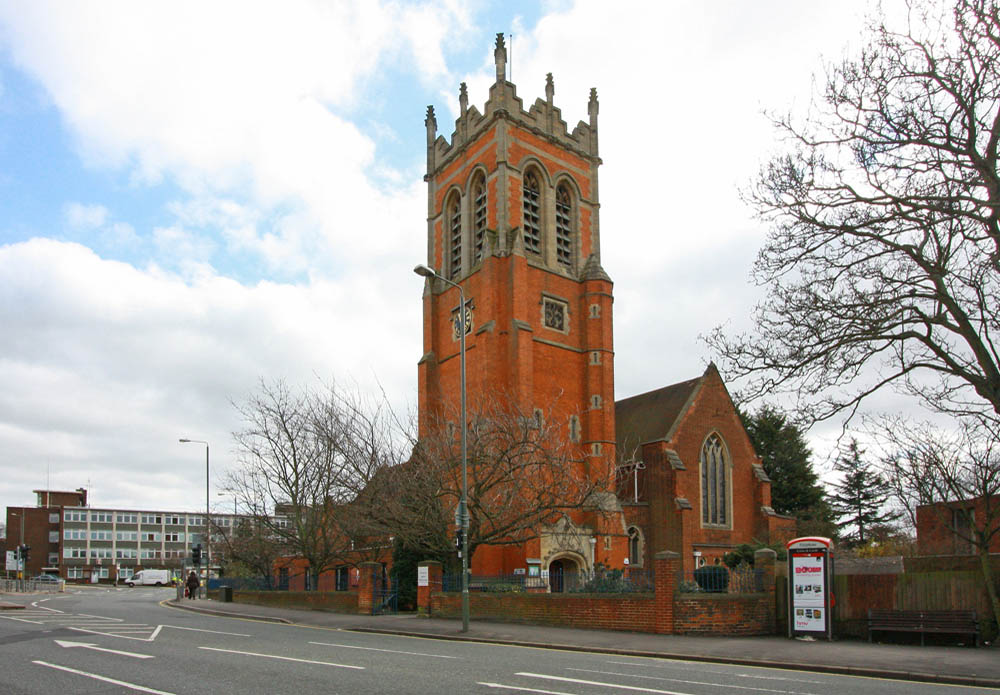
St Mark's Church on Westmoreland Road

Another parish church in Bromley is St Mark's, which stands on Westmoreland Road. The present church is the third. The first was built as a temporary iron church in 1884 to cope with Bromley's growing population, on land slightly to the east of the present church, donated by a local man Eley Soames. The road name St Mark's Road preserves the rough location of the former site.

The second church was built in brick and stone on the present site, and designed by Evelyn Hellicar, son of the then vicar of St Peter and St Paul's. It was completed in 1898 in the Perpendicular Gothic style and consecrated by William Walsh, Bishop of Dover, on 22 October that year. The tower, though, was not completed until 1904. Like St Peter and St Paul's, St Mark's was heavily damaged in the London Blitz of 1941. Only the tower survived intact.

On 3 June 1952, the Duchess of Kent laid the foundation stone of the present church, which was designed by T W G Grant and built by David Nye. Besides the tower, other parts of the fabric of the original church were used in the rebuilding. Inside there are various monuments: to Samuel Ajayi Crowther, John Cole Patteson and Vedanayagam Samuel Azariah, who were all bishops in the Commonwealth.

The East Street drill hall was completed in 1872.

== Notable residents ==
=== H. G. Wells ===
Author H. G. Wells was born in Bromley on 21 September 1866, to Sarah and Joseph Wells; his father was the founder of the Bromley Cricket Club and the proprietor of a shop that sold cricket equipment. Wells spent the first 13 years of his life in Bromley. From 1874 to 1879 he attended Tomas Morley's Bromley Academy, at 74 High Street. There was a 'H. G. Wells Centre' in Masons Hill near the southern end of the High Street which housed the Bromley Labour Club (the building was demolished in 2017). In August 2005, the wall honouring Wells in Market Square was repainted; the current wall painting features a rich green background with the same Wells reference and the evolutionary sequence of Homo sapiens featured in Origin of Species by Charles Darwin, a former resident of nearby Downe Village.

Wells wrote about Bromley in an early unsigned article in the Pall Mall Gazette in which he expressed satisfaction that he had been born in an earlier, more rural Bromley. A blue plaque marks Wells' birthplace in Market Square, on the wall of what is now a Primark store. A marble plaque appears above the door of 8 South Street, the location of Mrs Knott's Dame school where "Bertie", as he was called as a child, learned to read and write. H. G. Wells featured Bromley in two of his novels: The War in the Air (which refers to Bromley as Bunhill) and The New Machiavelli (in which Bromley is referred to as Bromstead).

However, H. G. Wells refused the offered freedom of the town, stating:

"Bromley has not been particularly gracious to me nor I to Bromley and I don't think I want to add the freedom of Bromley to the freedom of the City of London and the freedom of the City of Brussels – both of which I have."

He described Bromley in one of his novels as a "morbid sprawl of population".

=== Other residents ===
Owen Chadwick was born in Bromley in 1916. He was awarded the Order of Merit, was Vice Chancellor of University of Cambridge, Master of Selwyn Cambridge, Regius Professor of Modern History, Dixie Professor of Ecclesiastical History, Chancellor of University of Anglia, President of the British Academy, and was a Rugby Union International.

Other writers from Bromley include Captain W.E. Johns (author of the Biggles adventures), David Nobbs (author of The Fall and Rise of Reginald Perrin and writer for Les Dawson and The Two Ronnies), and Enid Blyton who wrote children's fiction. A blue historical plaque can be found on the external wall of her former home on Shortlands Road, Bromley.

Other notable people who lived in Bromley include David Bowie; Jane Downs, (actress); Talbot Rothwell, (screenwriter of twenty Carry On films); actress Justine Lord; Peter Howitt; Richmal Crompton; Pixie Lott; Matt Terry; Christopher Tennant; Hanif Kureishi; Peter Frampton; Aleister Crowley; Fatboy Slim; Jack Dee; Tom Allen; D. Bernard Amos; Rob Beckett; actor Alexander Molony; Gary Rhodes; Pete Sears; singer Poly Styrene; Billy Idol; Brian Poole (of The Tremoloes); Billy Jenkins; Alex Clare; cricketer Jill Cruwys; the anarchist Peter Kropotkin; the former Clash drummer Topper Headon; illustrator Charles Keeping, children's writer Andrew Murray; tenor Roland Cunningham; actor Michael York, who attended Bromley Grammar School for Boys; and clarinetist Chris Craker. The musical conducting brothers Stephen and Nicholas Cleobury were born in Bromley, as was suffragette Marie du Sautoy Newby. Actor Jerome Flynn, who starred in Game of Thrones as Bronn, was born in Bromley. Gus Lobban and Jamie Bulled of the band Kero Kero Bonito grew up in Bromley.

Deborah Linsley, the victim of one of Britain's most high-profile unsolved murders in 1988, grew up in Bromley.

Richard Reid, also known as the "Shoe Bomber", was born and lived in Bromley. He was convicted of the 2001 shoe bomb attempt.

In the 20th century, the Parish Church of St Peter and St Paul produced, in quick succession, three Church of England Bishops: Henry David Halsey – Bishop of Carlisle, Philip Goodrich – Bishop of Worcester, David Bartleet – Bishop of Tonbridge. Sculptor Nicholas Cornwell and Maisy James the Big Brother 12 housemate. Sometime before 1881 the engineer and industrialist Richard Porter moved to Beckenham where he remained until his death in 1913. Hanif Kureishi, the writer and filmmaker was born here, and spent a significant part of his youth, here. His first novel The Buddha of Suburbia was loosely based on his life here and the people he lived and met here.

Comedian Frankie Boyle claims to be a former resident and has described Bromley as a 'lobotomy made out of bricks'. The comedian Chris Addison currently lives in Bromley, as does tennis player Emma Raducanu.

Scottish education secretary Michael Russell MSP was born and spent the early years of his life in Bromley. Member of the Senedd Paul Rock was born in Bromley.

Bromley is the home of video game developer Splash Damage.

== See also ==
- Bromley Civic Society
