= Education in Orpington =

Overview of education in Orpington, England

Education in Orpington, England, is managed by the London Borough of Bromley which is the Local Education Authority. Orpington is a suburban town that forms the south-eastern edge of London's urban sprawl and is one of thirty five major centres identified in the London Plan.

== Nursery and primary schools ==
- St Mary's Pre-school Group, Green Street Green
- Robin's Den Playgroup (Hillside Primary school)
- Happy Faces Montessori
- Charterhouse
- St Mary Cray Primary School
- St Paul's Cray CE Nursery
- Bridgehouse Pre School
- Bright Sparks
- Cannock House
- Thresher's Day Nursery
- Asquith Nursery, Crofton
- Warren Road Primary School
- Hillside Primary School
- The Highway Primary School
- Blenheim Primary School
- Darrick Wood Infant School
- Darrick Wood Junior School
- Perry Hall Primary School
- Holy Innocents Catholic Primary School
- Crofton Infant School
- Crofton Junior School
- Poverest Primary School
- Tubbenden Infant School, federated with
- Tubbenden Junior School
- Avalon pre school playgroup, Church of Unity
- Midfield Primary School
- Leesons Hill Primary School
- Grays Farm Primary School

== Secondary schools ==
- Darrick Wood School, a comprehensive school and sports college in Lovibonds Avenue.
- Newstead Wood School, a selective girls' secondary school in Avebury Road.
- St Olave's and St Saviour's Grammar School for Boys, a selective boys' secondary school in Goddington Lane.
- Harris Academy Orpington (formerly The Priory School), a comprehensive school and sports college in Tintagel Road.

== Further education ==
- Orpington College is a further education college. It is affiliated with the University of Greenwich and Canterbury Christ Church University. Orpington College is the tallest building in Orpington, and was built in 1972.
