= Bromley Town Hall =

Municipal building in London, England

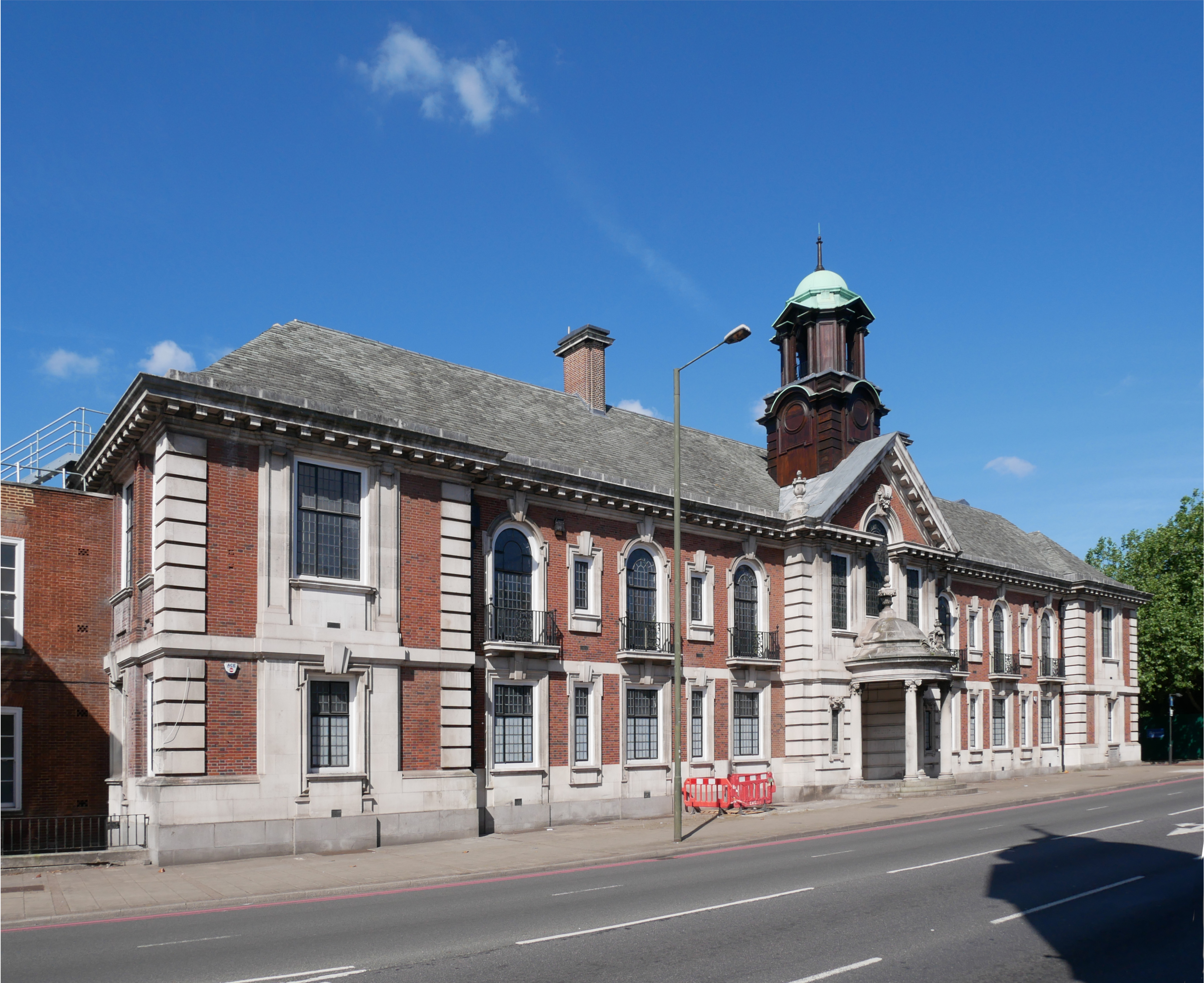
- Bromley Town Hall

- Shown in Bromley
- 51.4064°N 0.0179°E
- Location: Bromley

History
- Built: 1906

Site notes
- Architect: R. Frank Atkinson
- Architectural style: Baroque style

Listed Building – Grade II
- Official name: Town Hall, Bromley
- Designated: 29 June 1973
- Reference no.: 1299012

Listed Building – Grade II
- Official name: Town Hall Extension, Bromley
- Designated: 8 December 1993
- Reference no.: 1261448

Bromley Town Hall is a municipal building in Tweedy Road, Bromley, London. Built in 1906, it is a Grade II listed building.

== History ==
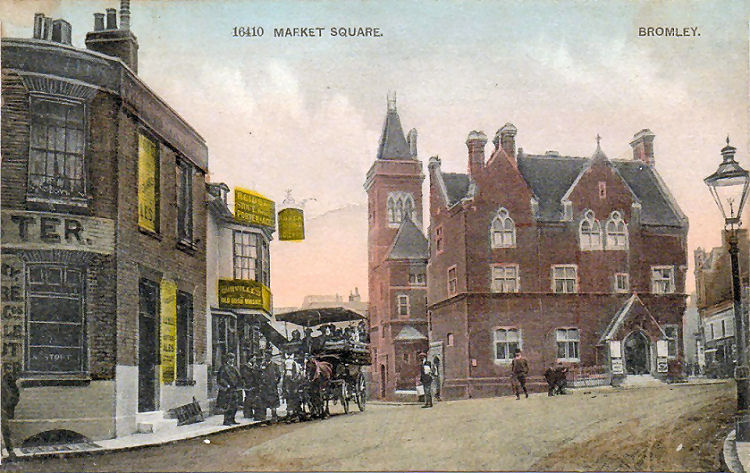
The old town hall in the Market Square

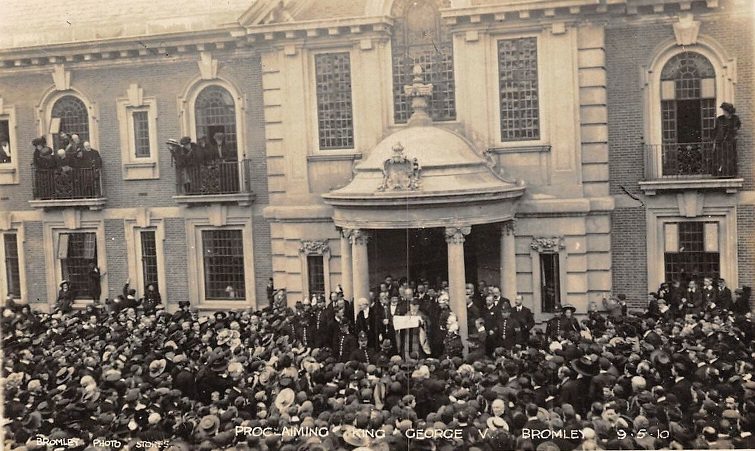
The proclamation of the ascendancy of George V to the throne being read out at the new Bromley Town Hall on 9 May 1910

The building was commissioned to replace an old town hall in the Market Square which was completed in 1863. The site selected for the new building was bounded by three existing residential streets.

The foundation stone for the new building was laid by a former charter mayor, Thomas Dewey, on 25 July 1906. The new building was designed by R. Frank Atkinson in the Baroque style and built by F. G. Minter of Putney. It was officially opened by the mayor, Alderman Reginald James, on 25 September 1907. The design involved a symmetrical main frontage with 15 bays facing onto Tweedy Road; the central section of three bays featured a semi-circular porch supported by four Ionic order columns and surmounted by an urn on the ground floor; there were three windows with a pediment above on the first floor; a wooden cupola with a copper dome was erected at roof level. The principal rooms were the council chamber and the mayor's parlour, both located on the first floor.

An extension designed by Charles Cowles-Voysey in the Neo-Georgian style was completed in 1939. The design involved a frontage of 17 bays facing onto Widmore Road; the central section featured a doorway with stone surround on the ground floor; there was a window with stone surround on the first floor. The principal room was a new council chamber located on a mezzanine level at the rear of the building.

The building was established as the headquarters of the Municipal Borough of Bromley and continued to function as the local of seat of government when the enlarged London Borough of Bromley was formed in 1965. David Bowie's wedding to Mary Angela Barnett took place in the town hall in March 1970. An underground nuclear fall-out shelter was built under the extension during the 1980s.

As part of a larger regeneration scheme to create a new Civic Centre, the council moved their offices to the old palace in 1982. The town hall was then used as the home of the Bromley College Business School until 2007. The building, which subsequently became vacant, was added to the Heritage at Risk Register in 2009. In 2020 works began to convert the town hall into serviced offices, a restaurant and to establish a boutique hotel on the site. Following completion of the works, which were carried out to a design by Cartwright Pickard, the building re-opened in September 2022.
