= St. Blaise's Well =

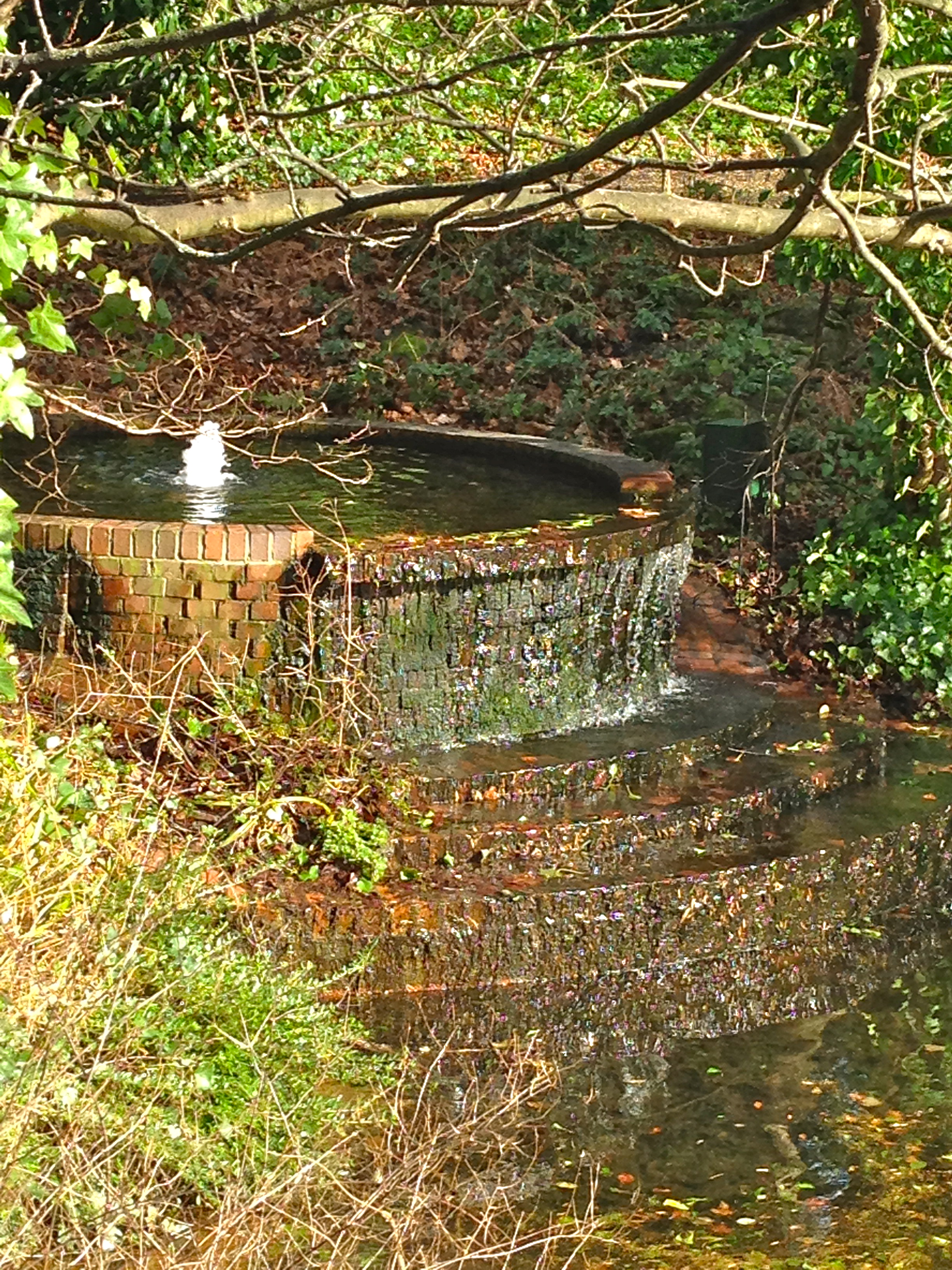
- St. Blaise's Well
- Interactive map of St. Blaise's Well
- Location: Bromley Palace
- Coordinates: 51.40387°N 0.02266°E

St Blaise's Well is a holy well located in the grounds of the old Bishop's Palace (residence of Bishops of the see of Rochester until 1845), now part of Bromley Civic Centre in Bromley, London.

== History ==
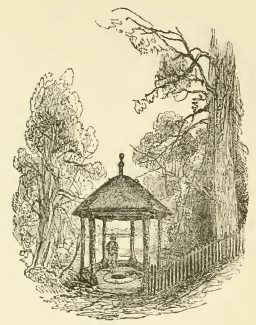
St Blaise's Well, Bromley (1827) 51.403°N 0.022°E

It appears that a spring already existed on the site when it was granted to Bishop Eardwulf by King Ethelbert II of Kent around 750 AD. A well was constructed a few hundred yards away from the source and marked with oak trees. Its chalybeate water (containing traces of iron) was reputed to have healing properties.

The well eventually became a place of pilgrimage and an oratory in honour of Saint Blaise was built close by (Bromley, and the west Kent area in general, was dependent on the wool trade of which Blaise was the patron saint). The site was visited, not only on account of the reputed medicinal properties of the water, but also for the 40 days' remittance of penance granted by the Pope to those who on the three holy days of Pentecost (Whitsun and the following two days) made their confession and offered prayers at St Blaise's Chapel.

After the Reformation, the oratory fell into ruin and the well into disuse – during the course of time becoming buried and forgotten. However it was rediscovered in 1754, by a Mr. Harwood, the Bishop's chaplain, who noticed a "yellow ochrey sediment, remaining in the tract of a small current, leading from the spring to the corner of the moat, with the waters of which it used to mix".

In 1756, Thomas Reynolds, a surgeon, conducted various experiments to test the medicinal qualities of the water from the well and wrote that "the water of this spring is much richer in mineral contents than the water of Tunbridge Wells". He also gave an account of the rediscovery of the well:

The Chalybeat Water.....arises at the foot of a declivity a very small distance eastward from the palace of the Lord Bishop of Rochester, at Bromley in Kent. The soil through which it passes is gravel and it issues immediately from a bed of pure white sand......in digging about it there were found the remains of steps leading down to it made of oak plank, which appeared as if they had laid under ground a great many years.

When his Lordship (i.e. the Bishop) was acquainted that the water of this Spring had been examined, and found to be a good Chalybeat, he, with great humanity, immediately ordered it to be secured...and enclosed in a circular brick-work like the top of a well......great numbers of people, of all conditions, but chiefly of the middling and poorer sort, drink daily of this excellent water, many of whom have been remarkably relieved from various infirmities and diseases, which were not only afflicting but dangerous.

An impression of the site, as it was in the early 19th century, can also be gleaned from this account by William Hone, in his "Table Book" of 1827:

The water of the Bishop's well.....rises so slowly as to yield scarcely a gallon in a quarter of an hour and is retained in a small well about sixteen inches in diameter. To the stone-work of this little well a wooden cover is attached by a chain. When the fluid attains a certain height its surplus trickles through an orifice at the side, to increase the water of a moat, or small lake, which borders the grounds of the palace, and is overhung on each side with the branches of luxuriant shrubs and trees. Above the well there is a roof of thatch, supported by six pillars, in the manner of a rustic temple, heightening the picturesque appearance of the scene (see illustration).

Hone also reported that the well was beginning to fall into disrepair and the area becoming overgrown – this process continued throughout the nineteenth century as the well became less popular as a tourist/pilgrimage site. In 1887, the owner of the Bishop's palace (Mr. Coles Child) reported that, "The well is still in existence, although the whole building, as restored by my father, was knocked into the moat during the last heavy snowstorm".

The well was eventually reconstructed and now stands in a Pulhamite rockery on the edge of a small lake. The outfall from the well flows into the lake which itself used to be part of the moat surrounding the old Bishop's palace (the latter now part of Bromley Civic Centre).

== See also ==
- Healthcare in London
