= Bromley Palace =

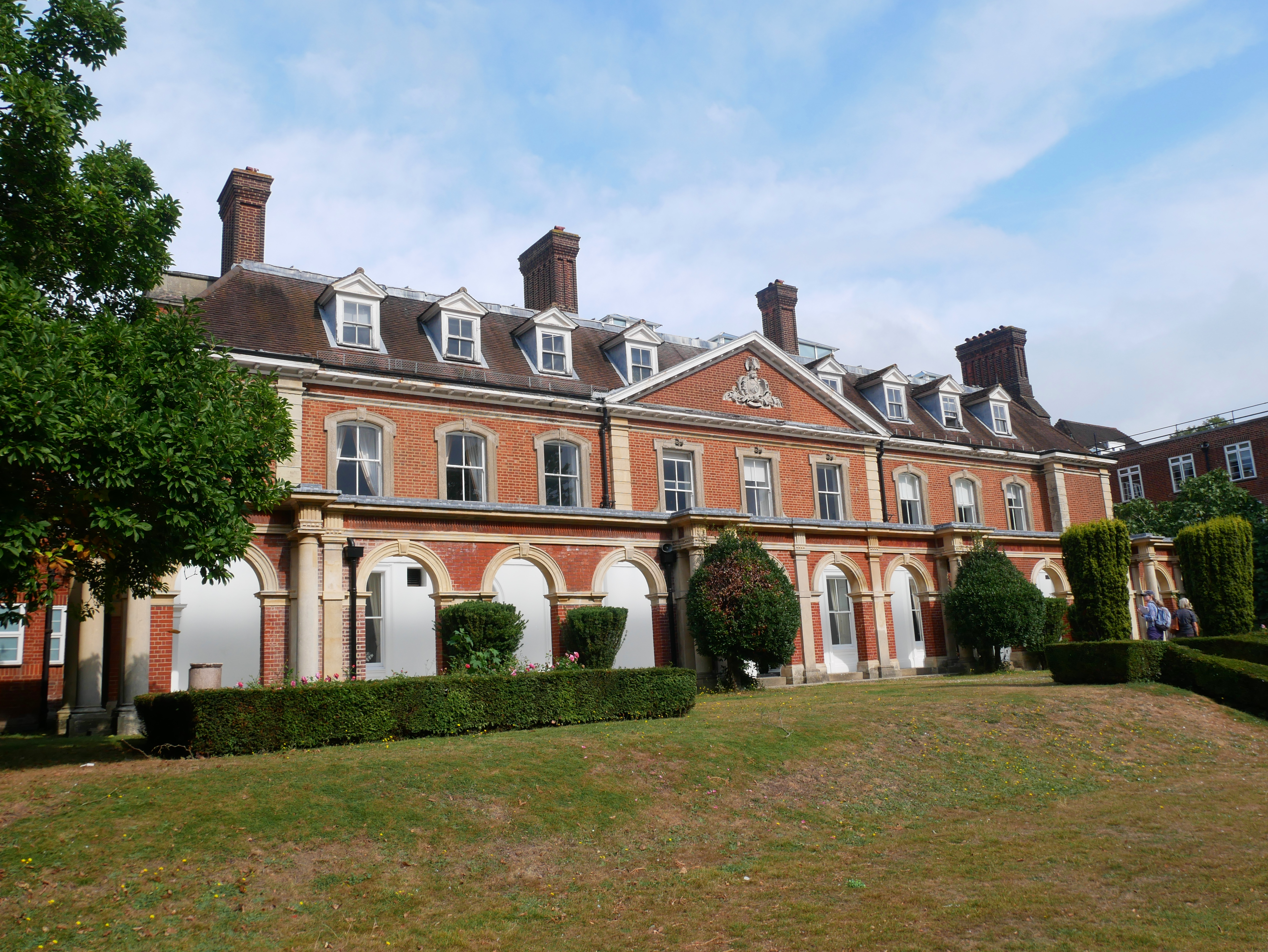
- The south face of Bromley Palace

- Shown in Bromley
- 51.4034°N 0.0215°E
- Location: Bromley, England

History
- Built: 1100

Listed Building – Grade II
- Designated: 10 January 1955
- Reference no.: 1281268

Bromley Palace (also known as the Bishop's Palace) is a manor house at Bromley in the London Borough of Bromley. The building, which was the bishop's palace of the Bishops of Rochester from the 12th century to 1845, is a Grade II listed building.

== History of the site ==
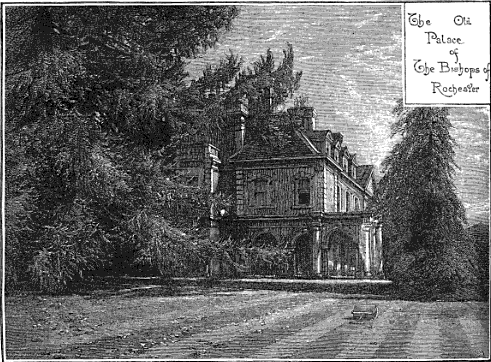
Bromley Palace, 19th century

In the 8th century, Æthelbert II of Kent granted six "sulings" of land, which came to be known as the Manor of Bromley, to Eardwulf, Bishop of Rochester. In 862 King Æthelberht of Wessex and Kent, granted 10 sulings in Bromley to his minister Dryhtwald. In 967, Edgar, King of England again granted 10 sulings of land to Bishop Ælfstan in return for a large sum in gold and silver.

In the year 987, a dispute between Æthelred the Unready and the Bishop of Rochester led to the land being seized and given to one of the King's ministers (Æthelsine) though a royal act of contrition led to its return in 998. After the Norman Conquest, another expropriation was attempted by Bishop Odo of Bayeux (half-brother of William the Conqueror himself) and Archbishop Lanfranc (of Canterbury) had to intervene to restore the land to the diocese.

The Manor of Bromley was described as "poor....neither pasture nor arable land being worth much". It is thought that a manor house was first built here around the year 1100. One source claims that the architect was Bishop Gundulph but this seems unlikely because he had a reputation for commissioning buildings of "massive and enduring character" and records show that Bromley Palace had fallen into dilapidation by the time of Bishop Waleran, who died in 1184. As a result, Waleran's successor, Gilbert Glanvill, ordered the manor house to be rebuilt – "in a more commodious manner". A historian had this to say about the original manor house:

The first house and gardens probably did not cover a larger space than two acres, and were surrounded by a moat. The masonry supporting the ancient drawbridge, the remains of which consisted of a rude mass of flint and chalk, cemented together by mortar which had become as hard as stone, was discovered....about forty-five yards north of the present house; and....to the south....foundation walls, the lower portions of which were constructed of blocks of chalk.

The grounds of the palace contained a Holy Well and Oratory dedicated to Saint Blaise and the site became a place of pilgrimage for centuries.

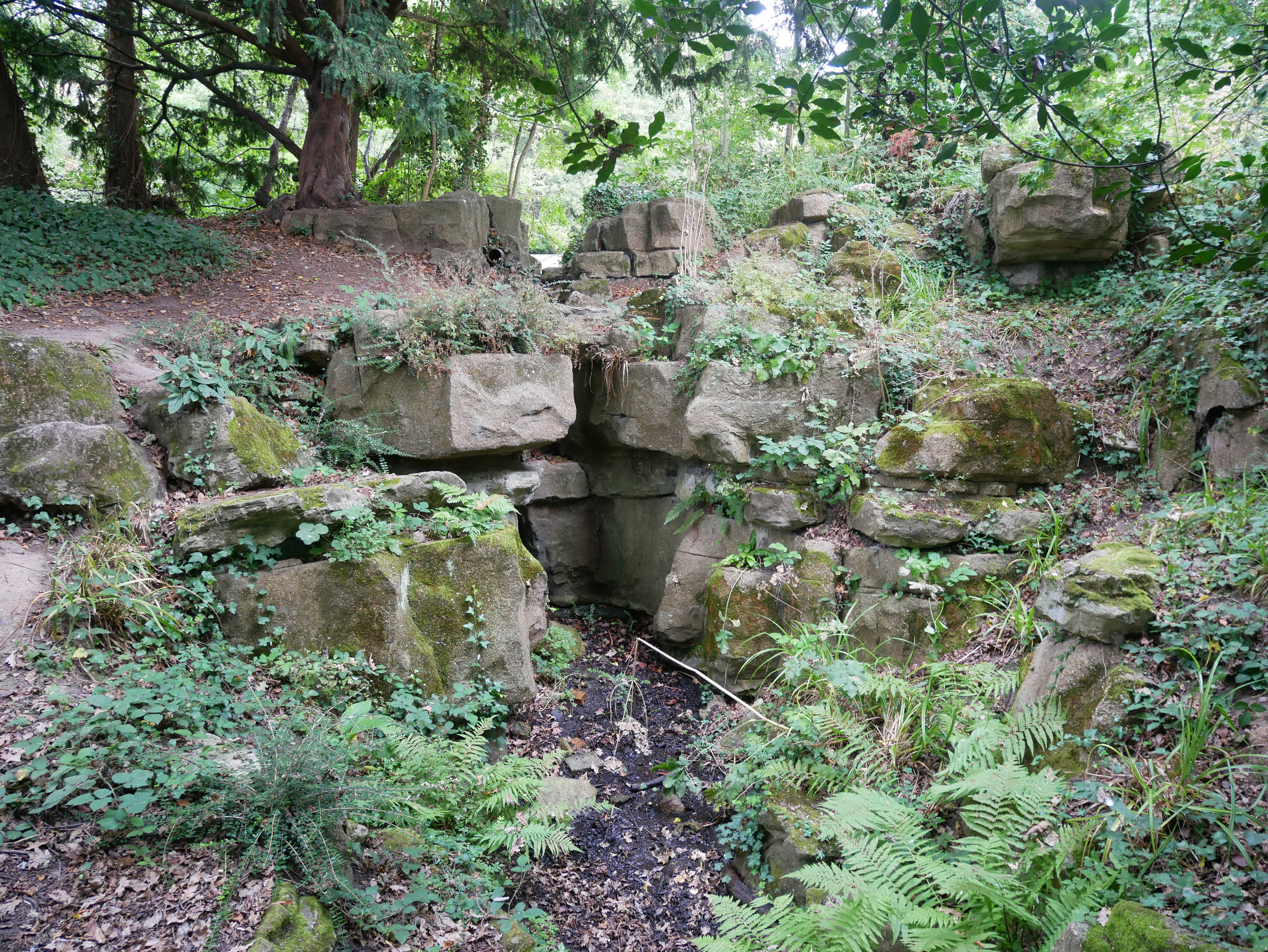
The pulhamite waterfall in the grounds of the palace, now Grade II listed

In 1648, during the English Civil War – and due to an Act of Parliament which ordered the disposal of certain church property – the manor of Bromley was sold to Augustine Skinner. The manor house was again returned to the Diocese of Rochester (and its rightful incumbent, Bishop John Warner) in 1660, on the restoration of Charles II.

In 1669, Bishop Sprat had the existing chapel (which was "wainscotted eight foote high with oake") pulled down and rebuilt (the new chapel was consecrated in 1701), and improvements were made to the grounds of the palace. Further additions and improvements were made to the manor by Bishops Francis Atterbury (served 1713–1723) and Joseph Wilcocks (served 1731–1756). But by 1774 the palace had fallen into disrepair and Bishop John Thomas ordered it to be pulled down and rebuilt – see illustration.

In 1845 the palace passed out of the hands of the bishops of Rochester when it was sold to Coles Child, a wealthy local businessman. He had the house remodelled in 1863 (reputedly by Richard Norman Shaw) and 1903/1920s (reputedly by Ernest Newton).

The 107th edition of Burkes Peerage, (2003), states the Coles were Lords of the Manor of Bromley, and lived in the palace. The actor Sir Coles John Jeremy Child, (1944-2022), was a member of the family.

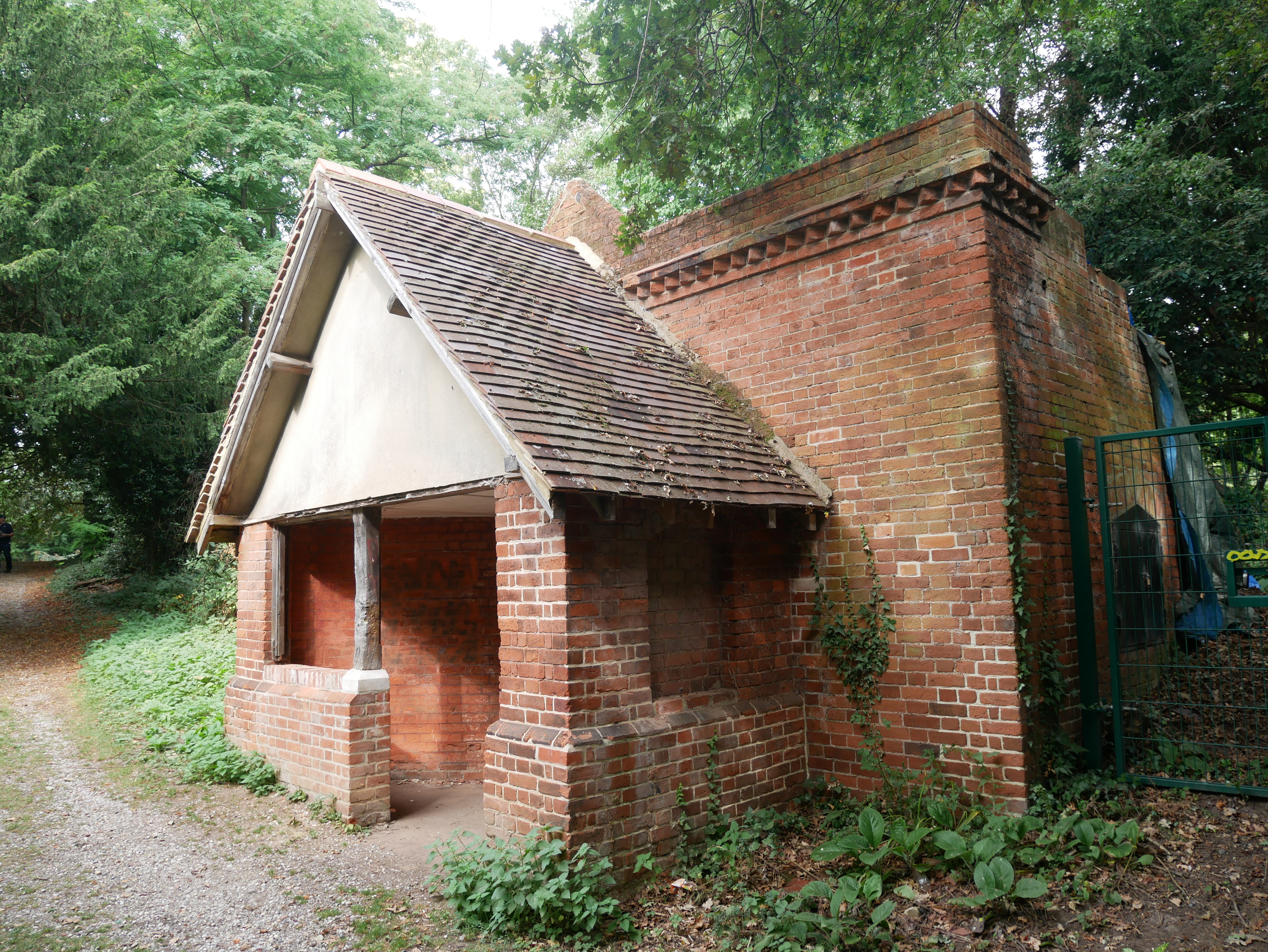
The ice house in the grounds of the palace park, now Grade II listed

In the 1920s it became a girls' finishing school and in 1935 Stockwell College of Education, a teacher training college when extensions were added. During the Second World War (from 1940 to 1945) members of the Stockwell College of Education were temporarily relocated to Watcombe Park, Devon. While the Stockwell College were away, the Bishop Otter College, Chichester whose own buildings were requisitioned by the Air Ministry, temporarily moved into Bromley Palace until 1944.

More extensions were added in 1960 when Kent County Council – then the county authority - took control. It became a grade II listed building in 1973. The college closed in 1980 and, as part of a wider regeneration scheme to create a Civic Centre, the London Borough of Bromley acquired the building in the early 1980s and built a large extension, moving from their town hall into the enlarged complex in 1982. The council moved again, relocating to a new Civic Centre at Churchill Court in December 2024.

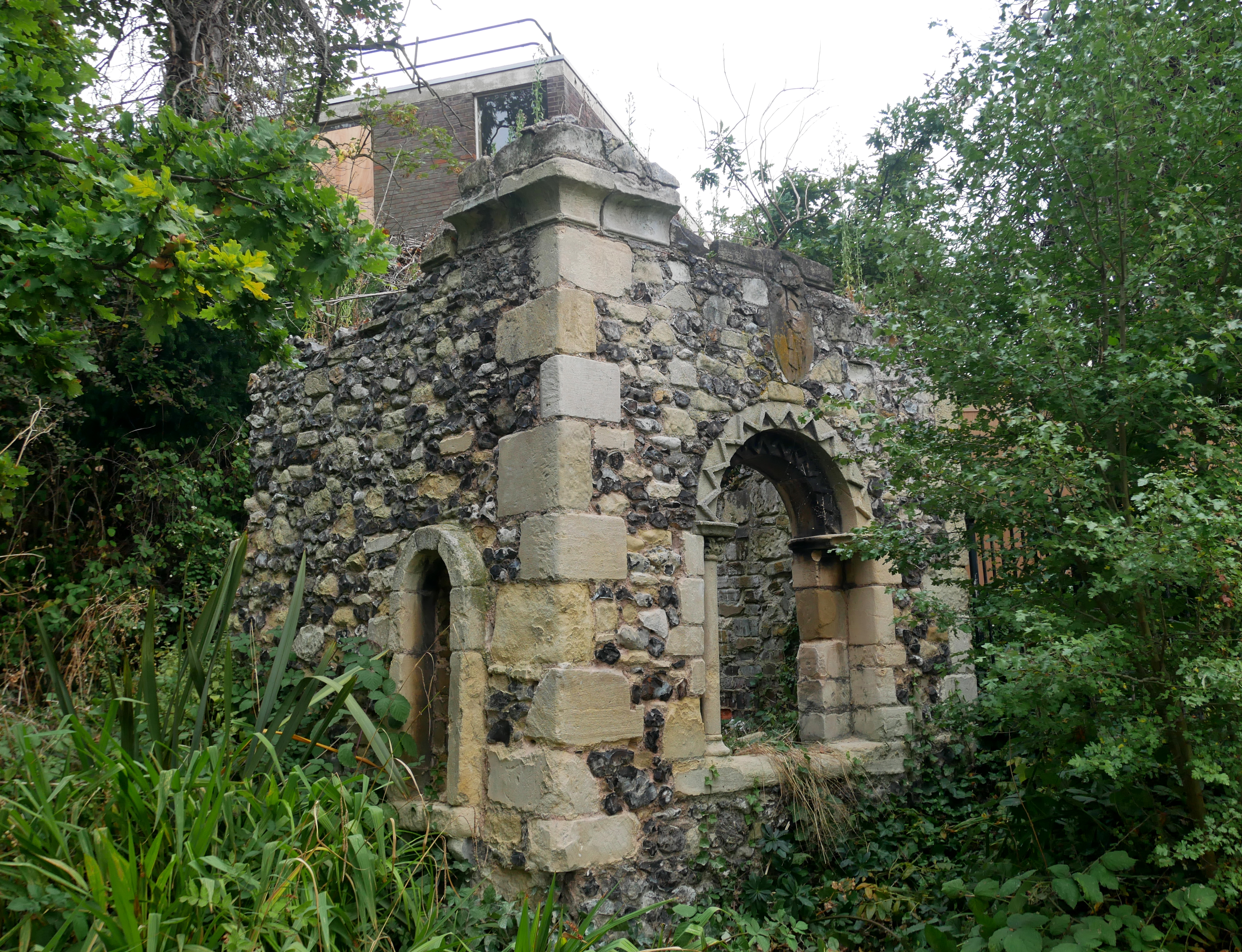
The faux-medieval folly in the palace grounds, now Grade II listed

A small area of the original parkland survives immediately around the palace. It comprises lawns, a lake, belts of mature trees, a boat house, pulhamite rockeries, an ice house (building) and a folly.

== See also ==
- Bishop of Rochester
- St Blaise's Well
