= Municipal Borough of Bromley =

Former local government area in the UK

Coordinates: 51°24′N 0°1′E

Bromley
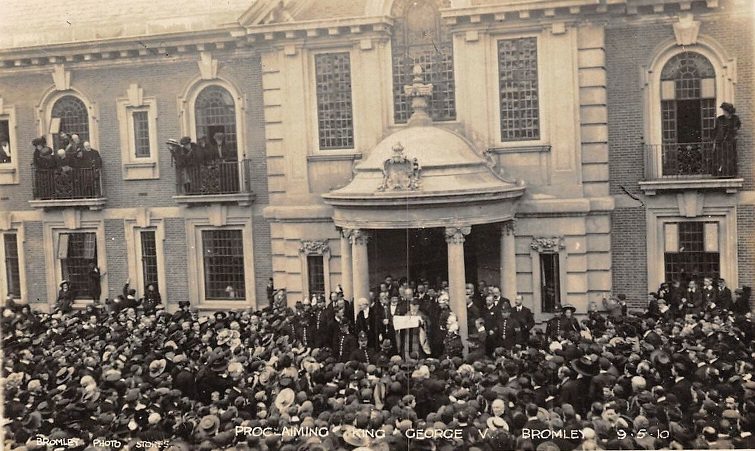
- Bromley Town Hall

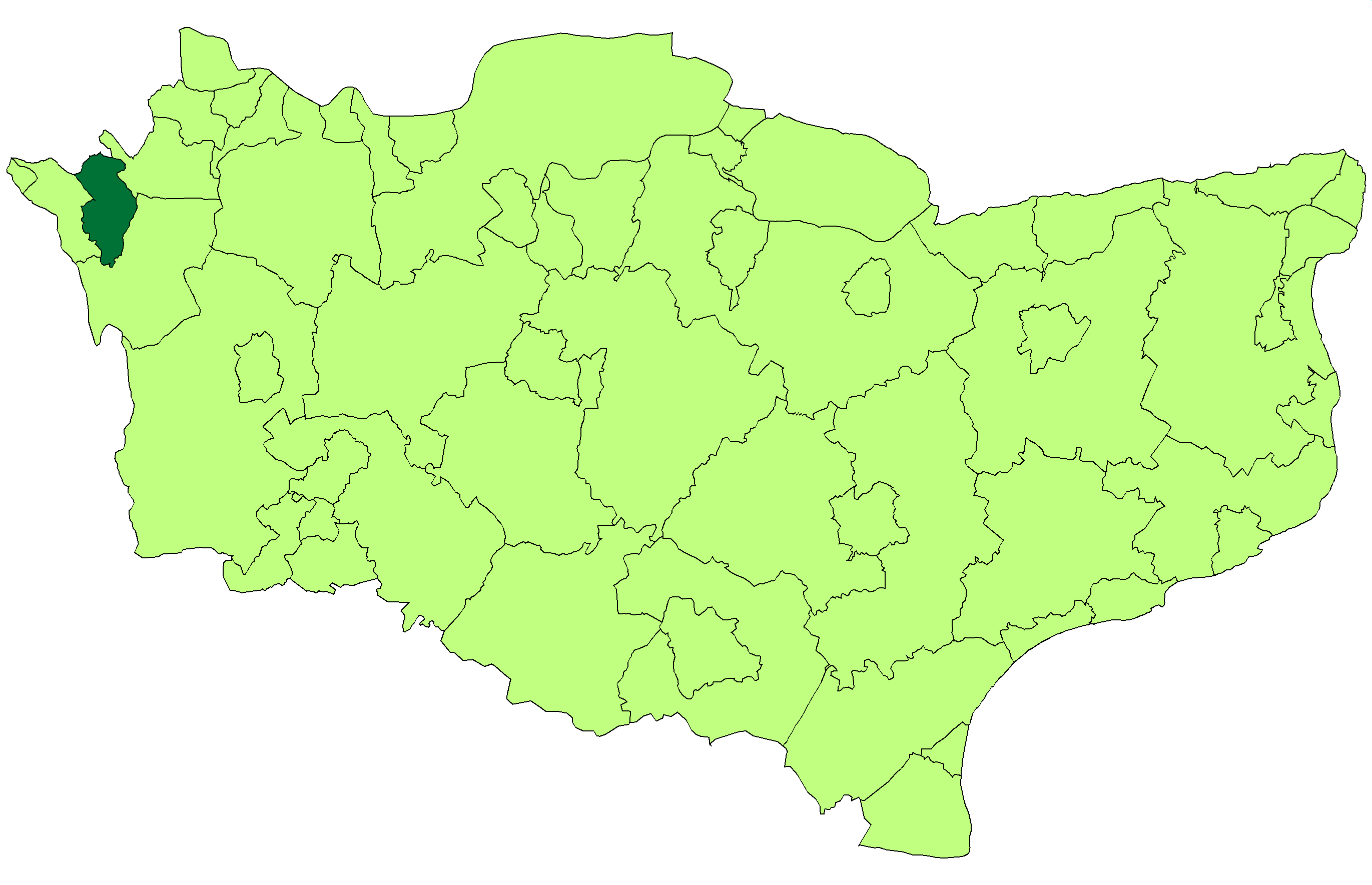
- Bromley within Kent in 1961
- Area
  - 1871: 4,706 acres (19.04 km^{2})
  - 1911: 4,696 acres (19.00 km^{2})
  - 1961: 6,513 acres (26.36 km^{2})
- Population
  - 1871: 10,764
  - 1911: 27,397
  - 1961: 68,252
- Density
  - 1871: 2.3/acre
  - 1911: 5.8/acre
  - 1961: 10.5/acre
- History
  - Created: 1867
  - Abolished: 1965
  - Succeeded by: London Borough of Bromley
- Status: Local board (1867 - 1894); Urban district (1894 - 1903); Municipal borough (after 1903)
- Government
  - HQ: Bromley Town Hall
  - Motto: Dum Cresco Spero (While I grow I hope)
- Coat of arms

Bromley was a local government district in northwest Kent from 1867 to 1965 around the town of Bromley. The area was suburban to London, and formed part of the Metropolitan Police District and from 1933 was included in the area of the London Passenger Transport Board.

== History ==
=== Local board and urban district ===
Bromley Local Government District was formed in 1867 when the parish of Bromley adopted the Local Government Act 1858, and a local board of twelve members was formed to govern the town. The Local Government Act 1894 reconstituted the area as Bromley Urban District. An urban district council of 16 members replaced the local board.

=== Incorporation ===
The town was granted a charter of incorporation to become a municipal borough in 1903. The granting of the charter was celebrated by a public holiday in the town on 2 September 1903. The charter was brought by train to Bromley South station where it was handed to the charter mayor. The mayor then rode in procession led by units of the Royal Horse Artillery and the Royal West Kent Regiment, accompanied by mayors and mace bearers of boroughs in Kent and the County of London and watched by an estimated crowd of 20,000. A sports day and carnival was held at Queen's Mead.

Under the charter a town council consisting of a mayor, six aldermen and eighteen councillors replaced the UDC.

The council was initially based at the old Town Hall in the Market Square but moved to a new Town Hall in Tweedy Road in 1907.

=== Boundary changes ===
The area of the borough was increased in 1934, when a county review order added parts of the abolished Bromley Rural District (Hayes and part of Keston). The council was subsequently enlarged to seven aldermen and twenty-one councillors.

In 1965 the municipal borough was abolished by the London Government Act 1963 and its former area transferred to Greater London from Kent. Its former area was combined with that of other districts to form the present-day London Borough of Bromley.

== Borough council ==
The borough council was initially controlled by independents, with a handful of Labour party councillors forming an opposition group. There was a single Communist councillor from 1945 to 1947. The Conservative Party began to contest elections in 1947, and gained a majority in 1950. At the final election prior to abolition the Conservatives lost their overall majority with 14 councillors and aldermen against 6 independents, 4 Labour and 4 Liberal members.

== Coat of arms ==
Armorial bearings were granted to the borough by the College of Arms on 19 April 1904. The blazon was as follows:
Quarterly gules and azure, on a fesse wavy argent three ravens volant paroper, between in the first quarter two branches of broom slipped of the third, in the second a sun in splendour, in the third an escallop shell or, and in the fourth a horse forcene argent. Crest: On a wreath of the colours, upon two bars wavy azure and argent, an escallop shell as in the arms, between two branches of broom proper.
The sprigs of broom were in allusion to the name "Bromley". The silver wave bearing three ravens represented the River Ravensbourne, while the sun was for Sundridge. The scallop shell was derived from the arms of the Diocese of Rochester, granted the manor of Bromley at the time of King Ethelbert. The arms were completed by a white rearing horse, the emblem of Kent.

The Latin motto adopted by the council was Dum Cresco Spero or "While I grow I hope".

== Notable people ==
▪︎Philip Hollobone
