= East Street drill hall, Bromley =

East street drill hall
- Bromley
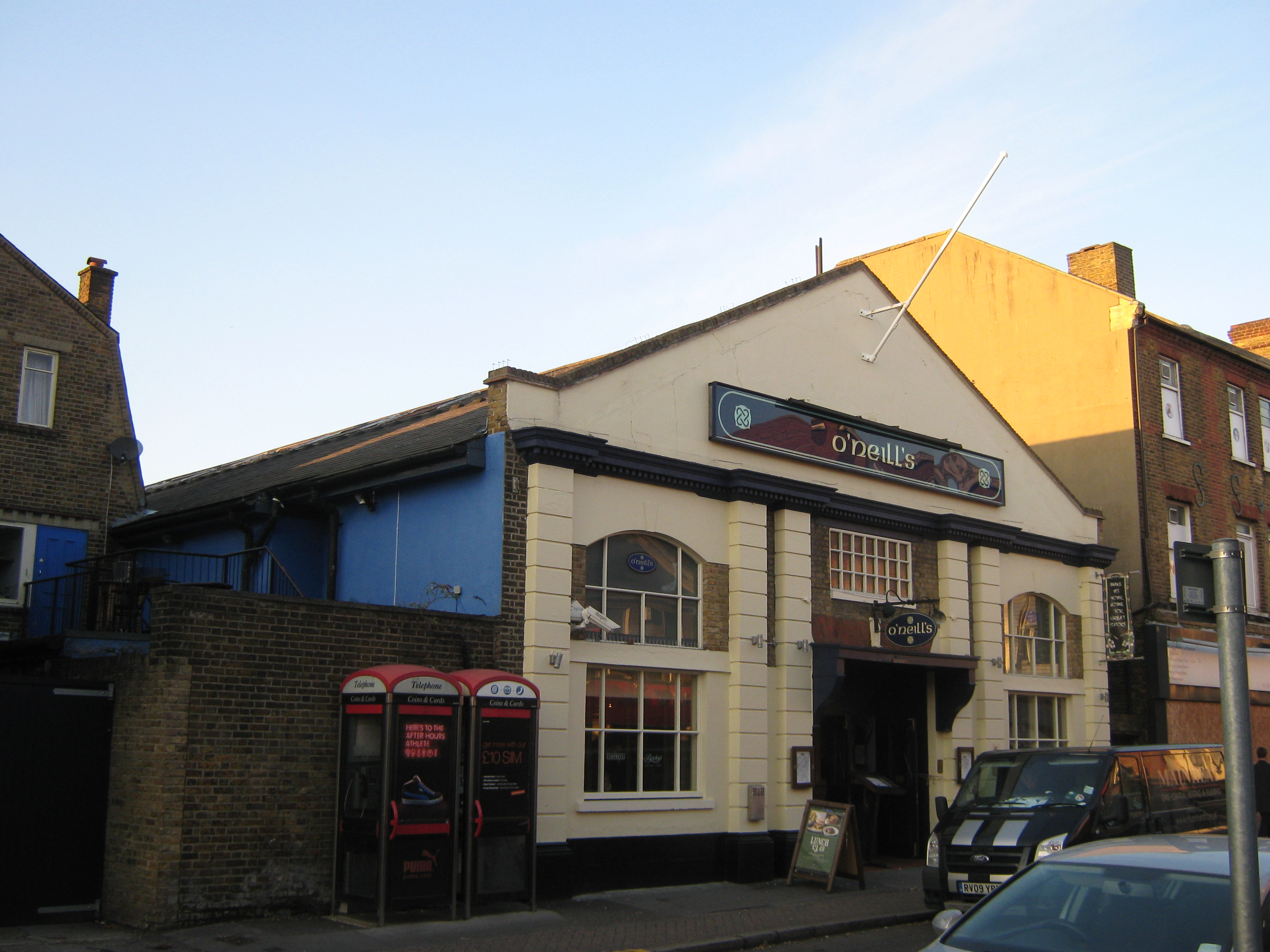
- East street drill hall

Site information
- Type: Drill hall

Location
- Location within Greater London
- Coordinates: 51.40761°N 0.01653°E

Site history
- Built: 1872
- Built for: War Office
- In use: 1872-1947

The East Street drill hall is a former military installation in Bromley.

== History ==
The building was at first a music hall. It then became a drill hall for the 18th Kent Rifle Volunteers and was completed in 1872. This unit went on to become E and F companies, 2nd Volunteer Battalion, the Queen's Own West Kent Regiment in 1883 and the 5th Battalion, The Queen's Own (Royal West Kent Regiment) in 1908. The battalion was mobilised at the drill hall in August 1914 before being deployed to India. After the battalion amalgamated with the 4th Battalion to form the 4th/5th Battalion at the Corn Exchange in Tonbridge in 1947, the East Street drill hall was decommissioned. Royal Mail then used it as a sorting office in the 60's to 90's, mainly as an overflow area to sort packets at Christmas. It was converted for retail use in 1997 and is currently an O'Neils pub.
