= Bishop Justus Church of England School =

Location
- Magpie Hall Lane; Bromley, Greater London, BR2 8HZ; England; 51.38244°N 0.04551°E

Information
- Type: Academy
- Motto: "Through faith, love and learning"
- Religious affiliation: Church of England
- Established: 2004
- Founder: Kathy Griffiths
- Trust: Aquinas Church of England Education Trust
- Department for Education URN: 136466 Tables
- Ofsted: Reports
- Head teacher: Barry Blakelock
- Staff: 160
- Gender: Mixed
- Age range: 11-18
- Enrolment: 1,367as of July 2021
- Student Union/Association: Unity Society
- Colours: Purple, Grey, Gold
- Budget: £9,218,602
- Website: www.bishopjustus.bromley.sch.uk

Bishop Justus Church of England School is a mixed secondary school and sixth form in the Bromley area of the London Borough of Bromley, England.

The school was first established in 2004, and is the only non-selective Church of England secondary school in Bromley under the direction of the Anglican Diocese of Rochester.

Bishop Justus School was converted to academy status in February 2012, and was previously under the direct control of the London Borough of Bromley. The school continues to coordinate with the London Borough of Bromley for admissions.
