= Chris Craker =

Chris Craker (born 1959 in Bromley, Kent, England), studied the clarinet at the Royal Northern College of Music from 1977 to 1981. He had a successful career as a clarinetist, playing with orchestras including the London Symphony, the Royal Philharmonic, the Scottish Chamber, and the London Chamber. He also founded and was the artistic director of The Prometheus Ensemble, one of Britain's premier chamber ensembles, and conducted a number of West End musicals such as Chess. He went on to conduct the works of Karl Jenkins in Japan, as well as the Bangkok debut of Chris de Burgh. His work as a composer is published by Music Sales and frequently broadcast on Classic FM. Craker was selected to produce the music for the Asian Games, including the hit theme song "Reach For The Stars", which was performed by Sony BMG pop artist Tata Young and sold over 2.3 million copies, reaching No. 1 in the pop charts.

He moved into the record business in the late 1990s and worked as a record producer for numerous labels, including EMI, RCA, and BMG. He founded several records labels, such as Black Box Music in 1998, which he later sold to Sanctuary Records. Sony BMG asked him to become the head of classics for the newly merged multi-national company. After one year in the London office, he was appointed general manager and senior vice president of the International Division of Sony BMG Masterworks, based in New York, where he stayed until his resignation in April 2008, after which he began to pursue independent activities once more—including founding the Karma Studios complex in Thailand. In 2008, Craker was appointed chairman of the Royal Northern College of Music development board.
