= Christopher Tennant =

American magazine editor, artist, and writer

Christopher Tennant (born August 17, 1978) is an American magazine editor, artist, and author of The Official Filthy Rich Handbook, published by Workman Publishing in June 2008.

Tennant graduated from the University of Wisconsin–Madison in 2000 with degrees in political science and journalism. While at Madison, he served as Editor in Chief of the Badger Herald, America's largest independent daily student newspaper.

The Official Filthy Rich Handbook—a satirical guide to fitting in with America's “top .0001 percent”—was pitched as a “quasi-sequel” to the best-selling 1980 classic The Official Preppy Handbook, also published by Workman. It was excerpted in the June 2008 issue of Vanity Fair.

Tennant began his journalism career after graduating college in 2000, when he was hired by Maer Roshan as a personal assistant at New York magazine. In the next decade he followed Roshan to Talk, Radar magazine and Radaronline.com, the independent pop culture magazine and web site that Roshan launched in 2003. He left the magazine in February 2008 as Deputy Editor.

From 2008 to 2010 he was the Executive Editor of The Daily Front Row, a cheeky fashion glossy distributed at New York Fashion Week. He is currently a contributing editor at Vanity Fair and editor at large of Playboy

In 2011, he launched a side career making Victorian-style aquatic dioramas. In 2016 he was hired as Executive Editor of Harper's Bazaar but left the magazine a year later.

== Bibliography ==
- "The Official Filthy Rich Handbook" - 2008 ISBN 0-7611-4703-9 (author)
- Vanity Fair (article archive)
- New York (article archive)
- "The Consiglieri of the Magazine World", Gawker
