= Darrick Wood School =

Location
- Lovibonds Avenue; Orpington, Greater London, BR6 8ER; England; 51.366084°N 0.063230°E

Information
- Type: Academy
- Motto: Revereor vitam (Respect for life)
- Established: 1975
- Department for Education URN: 136355 Tables
- Ofsted: Reports
- Head Teacher: Martin Airey
- Gender: Coeducational
- Age: 11 to 18
- Enrolment: 1786
- Hours in school day: 8:35-15:05
- Colours: Brown and Gold
- Website: darrickwood.co.uk

Darrick Wood School is a mixed secondary school in Orpington, London Borough of Bromley, United Kingdom with a current roll of 1785 pupils. It was first opened in 1975.

== History ==
The school opened in 1975. For the first two terms the students were accommodated at Charles Darwin School, Biggin Hill. The school expanded and when inspected in 2009, had Technology College status and has received a Healthy School Award and Sportsmark Award. It was a Microsoft Academy, allowing professional qualifications to be offered to both students and members of public. It converted to being an academy in 2010. It gained a Teaching school qualification in 2013 and the United Kingdom's World Class Schools Quality Mark which the previous school had gained, was confirmed in 2018.

== Structure ==
Darrick Wood School is a larger-than-average secondary academy which opened in December 1975, and converted to academy status in 2010. There is a hearing impairment resource provision within the school which is managed by the London Borough of Bromley. These pupils are fully integrated into the school. The majority of pupils are from a white British background and the proportion of pupils who speak English as an additional language is significantly below the national average. The proportion of disadvantaged pupils is significantly below the national average; in the lowest 20% nationally.

== Academics ==
Virtually all maintained schools and academies follow the National Curriculum, and are inspected by Ofsted on how well they succeed in delivering a 'broad and balanced curriculum'. Schools endeavour to get all students to achieve the English Baccalaureate(EBACC) qualification- this must include core subjects a modern or ancient foreign language, and either History or Geography.

Darrick Wood operates a three-year, Key Stage 3 where all the core National Curriculum subjects are taught. Year 7 is mainly taught in mixed ability tutor group set. In Year 8 and 9, Art, Drama, IT, and Religious Studies are taught in mixed ability groups. English, Mathematics, Science, Geography, History, Modern Foreign Languages and PE are set by ability.

In 10 and 11, that is in Key Stage 4 students study a core of English Language, English Literature, Mathematics, Science, IT, Core PE, PSHE (Sex and Relationship Education with Enterprise Education) and Religious Education Most students do a Modern Foreign Language. Students have three options chosen from three pools, each of which contain History and Geography, allowing an English Baccalaureate. Some students are offered a more vocational route. These students study a slightly reduced number of GCSEs.

== Head teachers ==
- Mr W.R.Turner (1975-1985)
- Mr Barker (1985-2000)
- Mrs Rhymaun (2000-2015)
- Dr Martin John Airey (2015–present)

== Controversy ==
In October 2007, a Darrick Wood member of staff was made redundant due to claims of stalking and sexual harassment of a teacher. In April 2009, an employment tribunal confirmed these allegations.
