= Justus =

7th-century missionary, Archbishop of Canterbury, and saint

Saint Justus
- Archbishop of Canterbury
- Appointed: 624
- Term ended: 10 November, between 627 and 631
- Predecessor: Mellitus
- Successor: Honorius
- Other post: Bishop of Rochester

Orders
- Consecration: 604 by Augustine of Canterbury

Personal details
- Died: on 10 November between 627 and 631
- Buried: St Augustine's Abbey, Canterbury

Sainthood
- Feast day: 10 November
- Venerated in: Eastern Orthodox Church; Roman Catholic Church; Anglican Communion
- Canonized: Pre-congregation, prior to formal canonisation process
- Attributes: archbishop carrying a Primatial cross
- Shrines: St Augustine's, Canterbury

Justus (Note: Sometimes Iustus) (died on 10 November between 627 and 631) was the fourth archbishop of Canterbury. Pope Gregory the Great sent Justus from Italy to England on a mission to Christianise the Anglo-Saxons from their native paganism; he probably arrived with the second group of missionaries dispatched in 601. Justus became the first bishop of Rochester in 604 and signed a letter to the Irish bishops urging the native Celtic church to adopt the Roman method of calculating the date of Easter. He attended a church council in Paris in 614.

Following the death of King Æthelberht of Kent in 616, Justus was forced to flee to Gaul but was reinstated in his diocese the following year. In 624, he was elevated to the Archbishopric of Canterbury, overseeing the dispatch of missionaries to Northumbria. After his death, he was revered as a saint and had a shrine in St Augustine's Abbey, Canterbury, to which his remains were translated in the 1090s.

== Arrival in Britain ==
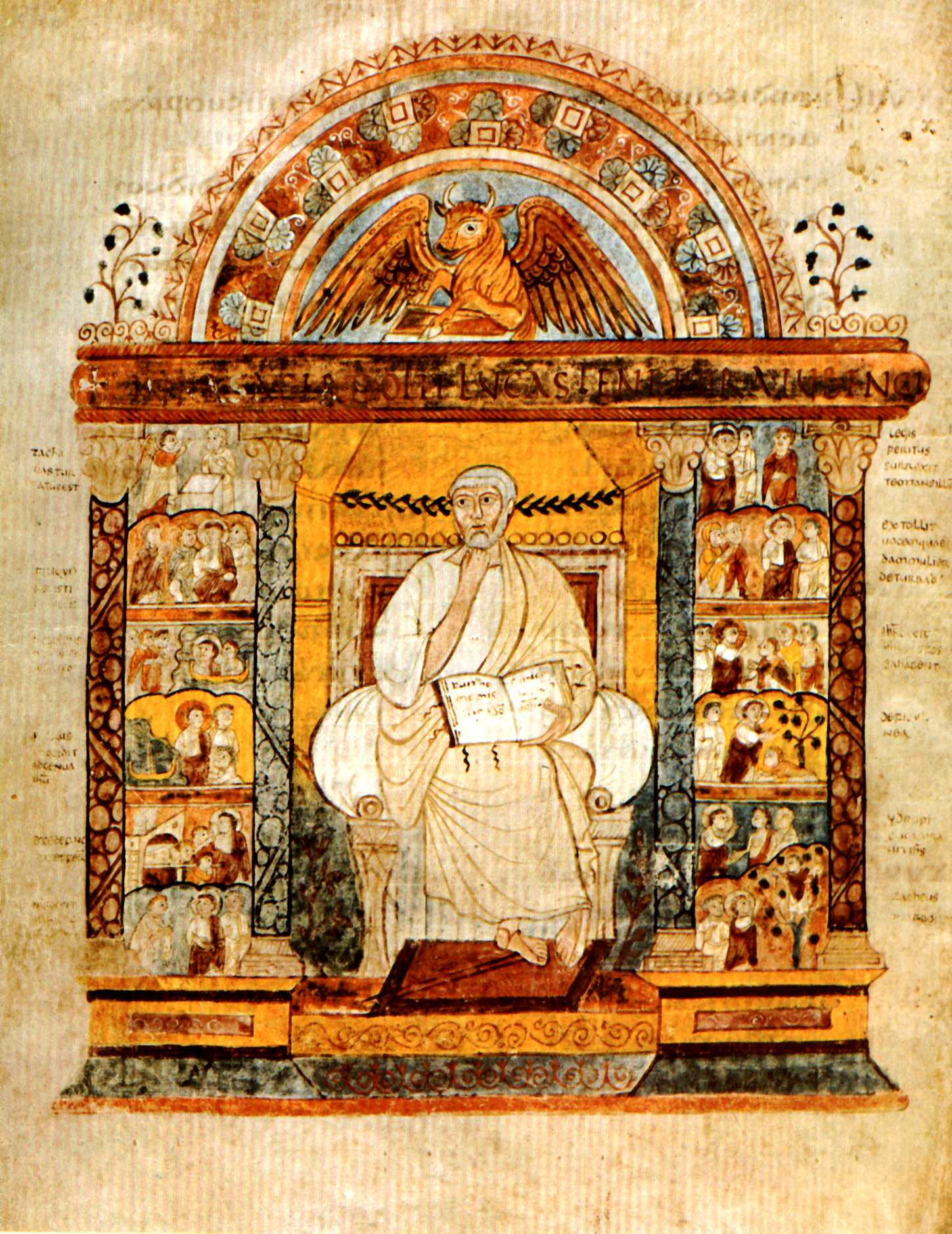
The evangelist portrait of Luke, from the St Augustine Gospels (c. 6th century), which may have accompanied Justus to Britain

Justus was a member of the Gregorian mission sent to England by Pope Gregory I. Almost everything known about Justus and his career is derived from the early 8th-century Historia ecclesiastica gentis Anglorum of Bede. As Bede does not describe Justus's origins, nothing is known about him before he arrived in England. He probably arrived in England with the second group of missionaries, sent at the request of Augustine of Canterbury in 601. Some modern writers describe Justus as one of the original missionaries who arrived with Augustine in 597, but Bede believed that Justus came in the second group. The second group included Mellitus, who later became Bishop of London and Archbishop of Canterbury.

If Justus was a member of the second group of missionaries, then he arrived with a gift of books and "all things which were needed for worship and the ministry of the Church". A 15th-century Canterbury chronicler, Thomas of Elmham, claimed that there were some books brought to England by that second group still at Canterbury in his day, although he did not identify them. An investigation of extant Canterbury manuscripts shows that one possible survivor is the St Augustine Gospels, now in Corpus Christi College, Cambridge Manuscript (MS) 286. (Note: Another possible survivor is a copy of the Rule of St Benedict, now Bodleian Library MS. Hatton 48. Another Gospel, in an Italian hand, and closely related to the Augustine Gospels, is MS Oxford Bodelian Auctarium D.2.14, which shows evidence of being held in Anglo-Saxon hands during the right time frame. Lastly, a fragment of a work by Gregory the Great, now held by the British Library as part of MS Cotton Titus C, may have arrived with the missionaries.)

== Bishop of Rochester ==
Augustine consecrated Justus as a bishop in 604 over a province including the Kentish town of Rochester. The historian Nicholas Brooks argues that the choice of Rochester was probably not because it had been a Roman-era bishopric, but rather because of its importance in the politics of the time. Although the town was small, with just one street, it was at the junction of Watling Street and the estuary of the Medway and was thus a fortified town. Because Justus was probably not a monk (Bede did not call him that), his cathedral clergy was very likely non-monastic too.

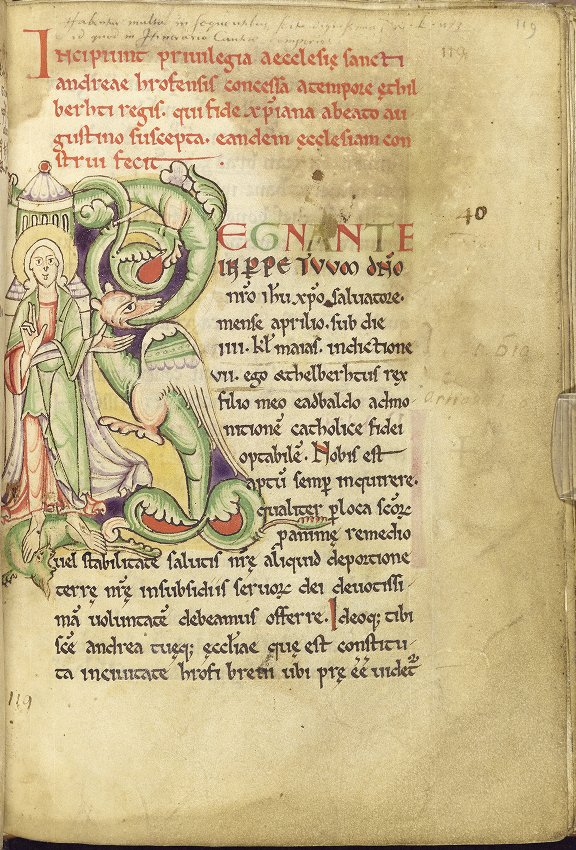
The beginning of the charter in Textus Roffensis

A charter purporting to be from King Æthelberht, dated 28 April 604, survives in the Textus Roffensis, as well as a copy based on the Textus in the 14th-century Liber Temporalium. Written mostly in Latin but using an Old English boundary clause, the charter records a land grant near Rochester to Justus's church. Among the witnesses is Laurence, Augustine's future successor, but not Augustine himself. The text turns to two different addressees. First, Æthelberht is made to admonish his son Eadbald, who had been established as a sub-ruler in the region of Rochester. The grant itself is addressed directly to Saint Andrew, the patron saint of the church, a usage parallelled by other charters in the same archive.

Wilhelm Levison, writing in 1946, was sceptical about the authenticity of this charter. He felt that the two separate addresses were incongruous, suggesting that the first address, occurring before the preamble, may have been inserted by someone familiar with Bede to echo Eadbald's future conversion. A more recent and more positive appraisal by John Morris argues that the charter and its witness list are authentic because they incorporate titles and phraseology that had fallen out of use by 800.

Æthelberht built Justus a cathedral church in Rochester; the foundations of a nave and chancel partly underneath the present-day Rochester Cathedral may date from that time. What remains of the foundations of an early rectangular building near the southern part of the current cathedral might also be contemporary with Justus or may be part of a Roman building.

Together with Mellitus, the bishop of London, Justus signed a letter written by Archbishop Laurence of Canterbury to the Irish bishops, urging the native Celtic church to adopt the Roman method of calculating the date of Easter (the computus). This letter also mentioned the fact that Irish missionaries, such as Dagan, had refused to share meals with the missionaries. Although the letter has not survived, Bede quoted from parts of it.

In 614, Justus attended the Council of Paris, held by the Frankish king, Chlothar II. It is unclear why Justus and Peter, the abbot of Sts Peter and Paul in Canterbury, (Note: This was later renamed St Augustine's Abbey.) were present. It may have been just chance, but the historian James Campbell has suggested that Chlothar summoned clergy from Britain to attend in an attempt to assert overlordship over Kent. N. J. Higham offers another explanation for their attendance, arguing that Æthelberht sent the pair to the council because of shifts in Frankish policy towards the Kentish kingdom, which threatened Kentish independence, and that the two clergymen were sent to negotiate a compromise with Chlothar.

A pagan backlash against Christianity followed Æthelberht's death in 616, forcing Justus and Mellitus to flee to Gaul. The pair probably took refuge with Chlothar, hoping that the Frankish king would intervene and restore them to their sees, and by 617 Justus had been reinstalled in his bishopric by the new king. Mellitus also returned to England, but the prevailing pagan mood did not allow him to return to London; after Laurence's death, Mellitus became Archbishop of Canterbury. According to Bede, Justus received letters of encouragement from Pope Boniface V, as did Mellitus, although Bede does not record the actual letters—the historian J. M. Wallace-Hadrill assumes both letters were general statements encouraging the missionaries.

== Archbishop ==
Justus became Archbishop of Canterbury in 624, receiving his pallium—the symbol of the jurisdiction entrusted to archbishops—from Pope Boniface V, following which Justus consecrated Romanus as his successor at Rochester. Boniface also gave Justus a letter congratulating him on the conversion of King "Aduluald" (probably King Eadbald of Kent), a letter which is included in Bede's Historia ecclesiastica gentis Anglorum. Bede's account of Eadbald's conversion states that it was Laurence, Justus's predecessor at Canterbury, who converted the king to Christianity, but D. P. Kirby argues that the letter's reference to Eadbald makes it likely that it was Justus. Other historians, including Barbara Yorke and Henry Mayr-Harting, conclude that Bede's account is correct, and that Eadbald was converted by Laurence. Yorke argues that there were two kings of Kent during Eadbald's reign, Eadbald and Æthelwald, and that Æthelwald was the "Aduluald" referred to by Boniface. Yorke argues that Justus converted Æthelwald back to Christianity after Æthelberht's death.

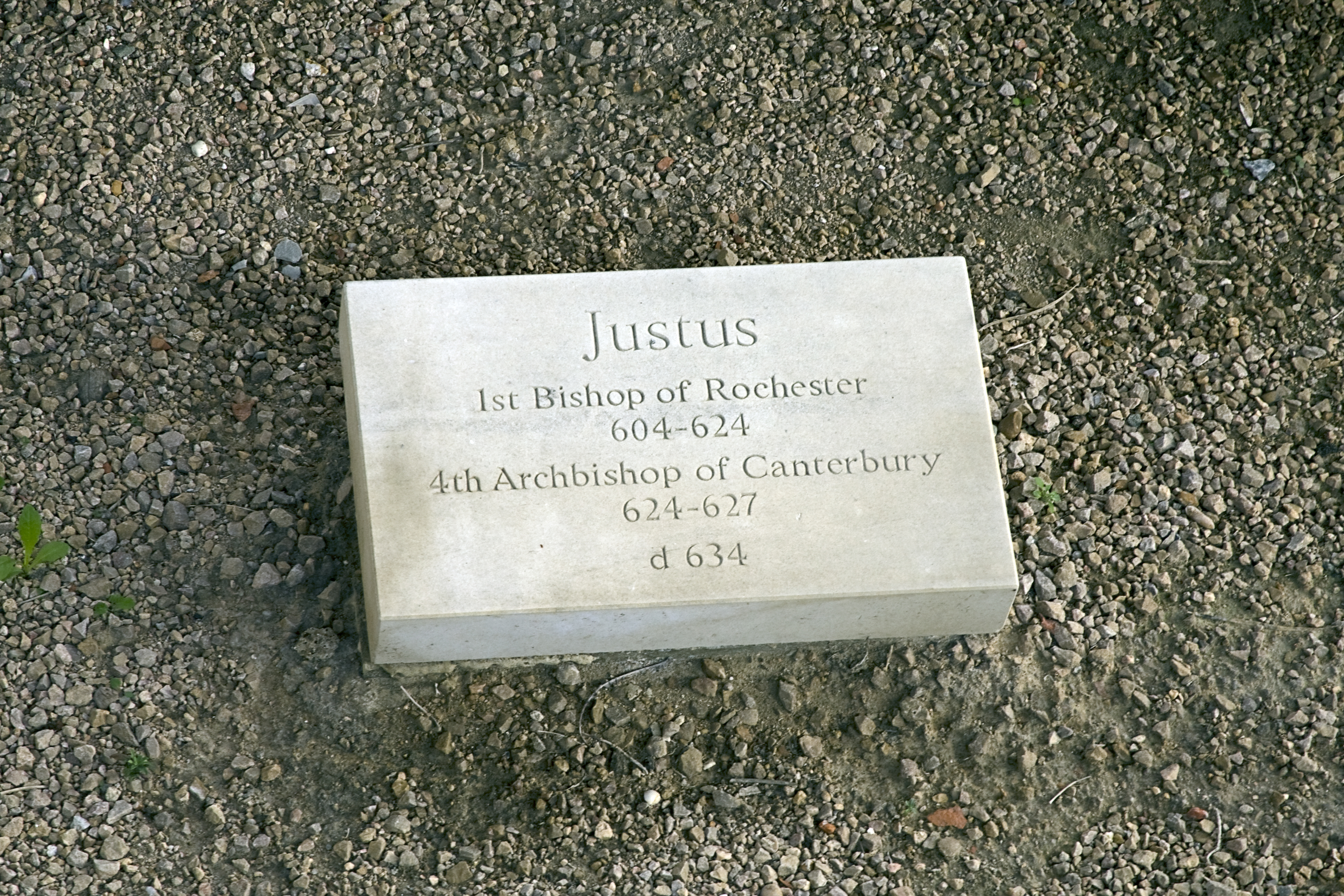
Modern gravestone marking the burial site of Justus in St Augustine's Abbey, Canterbury

Justus consecrated Paulinus as the first bishop of York, before the latter accompanied Æthelburg of Kent to Northumbria for her marriage to King Edwin of Northumbria. Bede records Justus as having died on 10 November, but does not give a year, although it is likely to have between 627 and 631. After his death, Justus was regarded as a saint, and was given a feast day on 10 November. The 9th-century Stowe Missal commemorates his feast day, along with Mellitus and Laurence. In the 1090s, his remains were translated, or ritually moved, to a shrine beside the high altar of St Augustine's Abbey in Canterbury. At about the same time, a Life was written about him by Goscelin, as well as a poem by Reginald of Canterbury. (Note: None of these works appear to have been published or translated within the last 200 years.) Other material from Thomas of Elmham, Gervase of Canterbury, and William of Malmesbury, later medieval chroniclers, adds little to Bede's account of Justus's life.

== See also ==
- List of members of the Gregorian mission

== Citations ==
Christian titles
Preceded by (diocese created)	Bishop of Rochester; 604–624	Succeeded by Romanus
Preceded by Mellitus	Archbishop of Canterbury; 624 – c. 627	Succeeded by Honorius
