= Mellitus =

Archbishop of Canterbury from 619 to 624, Christian saint

Saint Mellitus
- Archbishop of Canterbury
- Appointed: 619
- Term ended: 24 April 624
- Predecessor: Laurence
- Successor: Justus
- Other post: Bishop of London

Orders
- Consecration: 604 by Augustine

Personal details
- Died: 24 April 624 Canterbury
- Buried: St Augustine's Abbey, Canterbury

Sainthood
- Feast day: 24 April
- Venerated in: Roman Catholic Church; Anglican Communion; Eastern Orthodox Church
- Canonized: Pre-Congregation

Mellitus (/məˈlaɪtəs/; died 24 April 624) was the first bishop of London in the Saxon period, the third archbishop of Canterbury, and a member of the Gregorian mission sent to England to convert the Anglo-Saxons from their native paganism to Christianity. He arrived in 601 AD with a group of clergy sent to augment the mission, and was consecrated as Bishop of London in 604. Mellitus was the recipient of a famous letter from Pope Gregory I known as the Epistola ad Mellitum, preserved in a later work by the medieval chronicler Bede, which suggested the conversion of the Anglo-Saxons be undertaken gradually, integrating pagan rituals and customs. In 610, Mellitus returned to Italy to attend a council of bishops and returned to England bearing papal letters to some of the missionaries.

Mellitus was exiled from London by the pagan successors to his patron, King Sæberht of Essex, following the latter's death around 616. King Æthelberht of Kent, Mellitus's other patron, died at about the same time, forcing him to take refuge in Gaul. Mellitus returned to England the following year, after Æthelberht's successor had been converted to Christianity, but he was unable to return to London, whose inhabitants remained pagan. Mellitus was appointed Archbishop of Canterbury in 619. During his tenure, he was alleged to have miraculously saved the cathedral and much of the town of Canterbury from a fire. After his death in 624, Mellitus was revered as a saint.

== Early life ==
The medieval chronicler Bede described Mellitus as being of noble birth. In letters, Pope Gregory I called him an abbot, but it is unclear whether Mellitus had previously been abbot of a Roman monastery, or this was a rank bestowed on him to ease his journey to England by making him the leader of the expedition. The papal register, a listing of letters sent out by the popes, describes him as an "abbot in Frankia" in its description of the correspondence, but the letter itself only says "abbot". The first time Mellitus is mentioned in history is in the letters of Gregory, and nothing else of his background is known. It appears likely that he was a native of Italy, along with all the other bishops consecrated by Augustine.

== Journey to England ==
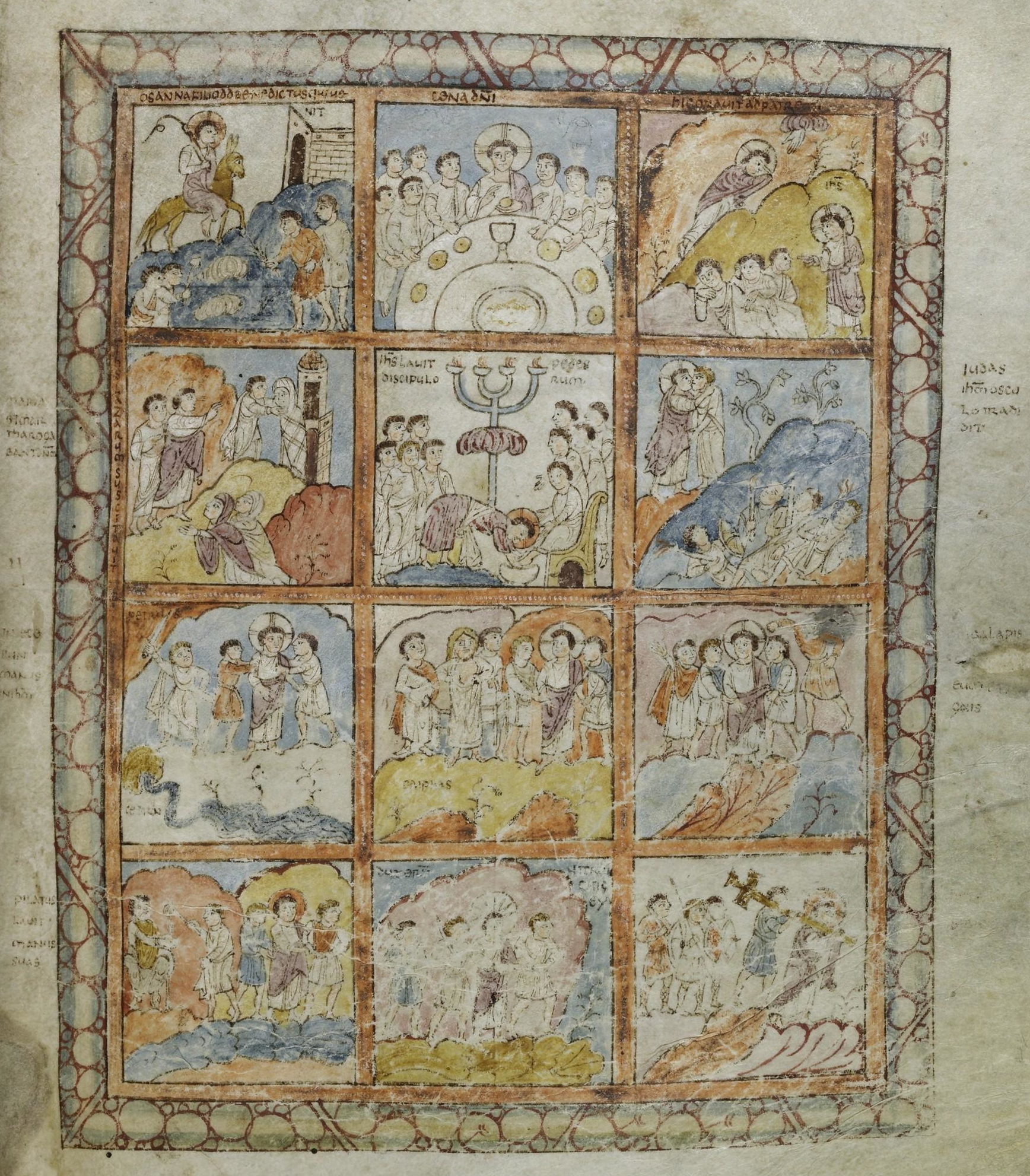
Passion scenes from the St Augustine Gospels, possibly brought by Mellitus to England

Pope Gregory I sent Mellitus to England in June 601, in response to an appeal from Augustine, the first Archbishop of Canterbury. Augustine needed more clergy to join the Gregorian mission that was converting the kingdom of Kent, then ruled by Æthelberht, from paganism to Christianity. The new missionaries brought with them a gift of books and "all things which were needed for worship and the ministry of the Church." Thomas of Elmham, a 15th-century Canterbury chronicler, claimed that in his day there were a number of the books brought to England by Mellitus still at Canterbury. Examination of the remaining manuscripts has determined that one possible survivor of Mellitus's books is the St Augustine Gospels, now in Cambridge, as Corpus Christi College, MS (manuscript) 286. (Note: Another possible survivor is a copy of the Rule of Saint Benedict, now Bodleian Library MS. Hatton 48. Another Gospel, in an Italian hand, and closely related to the Augustine Gospels, is MS Oxford Bodelian Auctarium D.2.14, which shows evidence of being held in Anglo-Saxon hands during the right time frame. Lastly, a fragment of a work by Gregory the Great, now held by the British Library as part of MS Cotton Titus C may have arrived with the missionaries.) Along with the letter to Augustine, the missionaries brought a letter for Æthelberht, urging the King to act like the Roman Emperor Constantine I and force the conversion of his followers to Christianity. The king was also encouraged to destroy all pagan shrines.

The historian Ian Wood has suggested that Mellitus's journey through Gaul probably included the bishoprics of Vienne, Arles, Lyons, Toulon, Marseilles, Metz, Paris, and Rouen, as evidenced by the letters Gregory addressed to those bishops soliciting their support for Mellitus's party. Gregory also wrote to the Frankish kings Chlothar II, Theuderic II, Theudebert II, along with Brunhilda of Austrasia, who was Theudebert and Theuderic's grandmother and regent. Wood feels that this wide appeal to the Frankish episcopate and royalty was an effort to secure more support for the Gregorian mission. While on his journey to England, Mellitus received a letter from Gregory allowing Augustine to convert pagan temples to Christian churches, and to convert pagan animal sacrifices into Christian feasts, to ease the transition to Christianity. Gregory's letter marked a sea change in the missionary strategy, and was later included in Bede's Ecclesiastical History of the English People. Usually known as the Epistola ad Mellitum, it conflicts with the letter sent to Æthelberht, which the historian R. A. Markus sees as a turning point in missionary history, when forcible conversion gave way to persuasion. This traditional view, that the Epistola represents a contradiction of the letter to Æthelberht, has been challenged by the historian and theologian George Demacopoulos, who argues that the letter to Æthelberht was mainly meant to encourage the King in spiritual matters, while the Epistola was sent to deal with purely practical matters, and thus the two do not contradict each other.

== Bishop of London ==
Exactly when Mellitus and his party arrived in England is unknown, but he was certainly in the country by 604, when Augustine consecrated him as bishop in the province of the East Saxons, making Mellitus the first Bishop of London after the Roman departure (London was the East Saxons' capital). The city was a logical choice for a new bishopric, as it was a hub for the southern road network. It was also a former Roman town; many of the Gregorian mission's efforts were centred in such locations. Before his consecration, Mellitus baptised Sæberht, Æthelberht's nephew, who then allowed the bishopric to be established. Æthelberht, rather than Sæberht, probably founded the episcopal church built in London. Although Bede records that Æthelberht gave lands to support the new episcopate, a charter that claims to be a grant of lands from Æthelberht to Mellitus is a later forgery.

Although Gregory had intended London to be the southern archbishopric for the island, Augustine never moved his episcopal see to London, and instead consecrated Mellitus as a plain bishop there. (Note: Although the historian S. Brechter argued that Augustine did in fact move the archbishopric to London, and that Mellitus was his successor there instead of Laurence, this has been shown to be unlikely.) After Augustine's death in 604, Canterbury continued to be the site of the southern archbishopric, and London remained a bishopric. It may have been that the Kentish king did not wish greater episcopal authority to be exercised outside his own kingdom.

Mellitus attended a council of bishops held in Italy in February 610, convened by Pope Boniface IV. The historian N. J. Higham speculates that one reason for his attendance may have been to assert the English Church's independence from the Frankish Church. Boniface had Mellitus take two papal letters back to England, one to Æthelbert and his people, and another to Laurence, the Archbishop of Canterbury. He also brought back the synod's decrees to England. No authentic letters or documents from this synod remain, although some were forged in the 1060s and 1070s at Canterbury. During his time as a bishop, Mellitus joined with Justus, the Bishop of Rochester, in signing a letter that Laurence wrote to the Celtic bishops urging the Celtic Church to adopt the Roman method of calculating the date of Easter. This letter also mentioned the fact that Irish missionary bishops, such as Dagan, refused to eat with the Roman missionaries.

Both Æthelberht and Sæberht died around 616 or 618, causing a crisis for the mission. Sæberht's three sons had not converted to Christianity, and drove Mellitus from London. Bede says that Mellitus was exiled because he refused the brothers' request for a taste of the sacramental bread. (Note: The historian James Campbell speculates that the brothers may have wanted a taste either because they thought it was magical or because the bread was white, which was rare at the time.) Whether this occurred immediately after Sæberht's death or later is impossible to determine from Bede's chronology, which has both events in the same chapter but gives neither an exact time frame nor the elapsed time between the two events. The historian N. J. Higham connects the timing of this episode with a change in the "overkingship" from the Christian Kentish Æthelberht to the pagan East Anglian Raedwald, which Higham feels happened after Æthelberht's death. In Higham's view, Sæberht's sons drove Mellitus from London because they had passed from Kentish overlordship to East Anglian, and thus no longer needed to keep Mellitus, who was connected with the Kentish kingdom, in office.

Mellitus fled first to Canterbury, but Æthelberht's successor Eadbald was also a pagan, so Mellitus, accompanied by Justus, took refuge in Gaul. Mellitus was recalled to Britain by Laurence, the second Archbishop of Canterbury, after he converted Eadbald. How long Mellitus's exile lasted is unclear. Bede claims it was a year, but it may have been longer. Mellitus did not return to London, because the East Saxons remained pagan. Although Mellitus fled, there does not seem to have been any serious persecution of Christians in the East Saxon kingdom. The East Saxon see was not occupied again until Cedd was consecrated as bishop in about 654.

== Archbishop and death ==
Mellitus succeeded Laurence as the third Archbishop of Canterbury after the latter's death in 619. During his tenure as archbishop, Mellitus supposedly performed a miracle in 623 by diverting a fire that had started in Canterbury and threatened the church. He was carried into the flames, upon which the wind changed direction, thus saving the building. Bede praised Mellitus's sane mind, but other than the miracle, little happened during his time as archbishop. Bede also mentioned that Mellitus suffered from gout. Boniface wrote to Mellitus, encouraging him in the mission, perhaps prompted by the marriage of Æthelburh of Kent to King Edwin of Northumbria. Whether Mellitus received a pallium, the symbol of an archbishop's authority, from the pope is unknown.

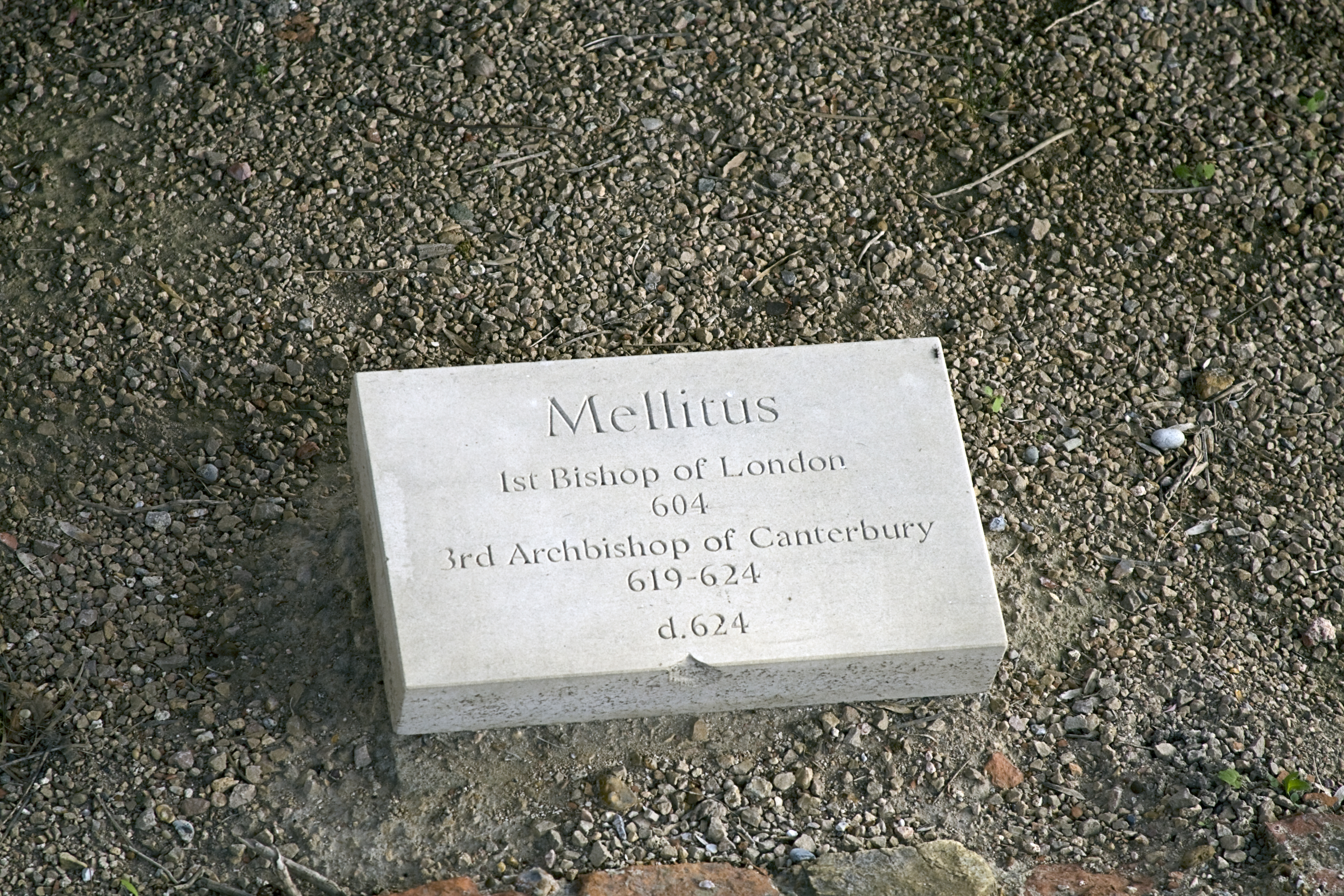
Stone marking the site of Mellitus's grave in St Augustine's Abbey, Canterbury

Mellitus died on 24 April 624, and was buried at St Augustine's Abbey in Canterbury that same day. He became revered as a saint after his death, and was allotted the feast day of 24 April. In the ninth century, Mellitus's feast day was mentioned in the Stowe Missal, along with Laurence and Justus. He was still venerated at St Augustine's in 1120, along with a number of other local saints. There was also a shrine to him at Old St Paul's Cathedral in London. Shortly after the Norman Conquest, Goscelin wrote a life of Mellitus, the first of several to appear around that time, but none contain any information not included in Bede's earlier works. These later medieval lives do, however, reveal that during Goscelin's lifetime, persons suffering from gout were urged to pray at Mellitus's tomb. Goscelin records that Mellitus's shrine flanked that of Augustine, along with Laurence, in the eastern central chapel of the presbytery.

== See also ==
- List of members of the Gregorian mission

== Citations ==
Christian titles
Preceded by Theonus	Bishop of London; 604–619	Succeeded by Cedd
Preceded by Laurence	Archbishop of Canterbury; 619–624	Succeeded by Justus
