= James the Deacon =

7th- and 8th-century missionary to Britain and saint

Saint James the Deacon
- Died: after 671
- Venerated in: Catholic Church; Anglicanism
- Canonized: Pre-Congregation
- Feast: 17 August or 11 October

James the Deacon (Note: Latin: Iacomus Diaconus) (died after 671) was a Roman deacon who accompanied Paulinus of York on his mission to Northumbria. He was a member of the Gregorian mission, which went to England to Christianise the Anglo-Saxons from their native Anglo-Saxon paganism. However, when he arrived in England is unknown. After Paulinus left Northumbria, James stayed near Lincoln and continued his missionary efforts, dying sometime after 671, according to the Anglo-Saxon historian Bede.

== Life ==
James was presumably an Italian, like the other members of the Gregorian mission. The dates of his birth and his arrival in Britain are unknown. He went with Paulinus to Northumbria accompanying Æthelburh, sister of King Eadbald of Kent, who went to Northumbria to marry King Edwin. Traditionally, this event is dated to 625, but the historian D. P. Kirby argues that the mission to Northumbria probably happened before 619.

Edwin died in battle at Hatfield fighting against Penda of Mercia and Caedwalla in 633. Edwin had been the main supporter of Paulinus' mission, and with his death, a pagan backlash set in. Paulinus fled to Kent, along with Æthelburg and Edwin and Æthelburg's daughter Eanflæd. James, however, remained behind in Northumbria and continued missionary efforts. James' efforts were centred in Lincoln, at a church that Paulinus had built there, the remains of which may lie under the church of St Paul-in-the-Bail. This was in the dependent kingdom of Lindsey, where Paulinus had preached before Edwin's death, and it was reconquered by one of Edwin's successors, Oswald of Northumbria, in the 640s.

Bede writes that James lived in a village near Catterick, which "bears his name to this day". He reports that James undertook missionary work in the area and lived to a great age. During the reign of King Oswiu of Northumbria, James attended the royal court, for he celebrated Easter with Oswiu's queen, Eanflæd, Edwin's daughter. James and Eanflæd celebrated Easter on the date used by the Roman church, which led to conflicts with Oswiu, who celebrated Easter on the date calculated by the Irish church. These dates did not always agree and were one of the reasons that Oswiu called the Synod of Whitby in 664 to decide which system of Easter calculation his kingdom would use.

According to Bede's account of events, James was present at the Synod of Whitby. (Note: Eddius Stephanus' Life of Wilfred does not mention James in his account of the synod.) Bede states that after the synod, and the return of Roman customs, James, as a trained singing master in the Roman and Kentish style, taught many people plainsong or Gregorian chant in the Roman manner.

James' date of death is unknown, but Bede implies that he was still alive during Bede's lifetime, meaning he died after Bede's birth, around 671 or 672. This would mean he was at least 70 years old at his death. It has been suggested that James was Bede's informant for the life of Edwin, the works of Paulinus, and perhaps the Synod of Whitby. The historian Frank Stenton calls James "the one heroic figure in the Roman mission". This reflects the fact that many of the Gregorian missionaries had a habit of fleeing when things went wrong.

After his death, James was venerated as a saint. His feast day is 17 August (Catholic General Roman Calendar) or 11 October (Church of England).

== See also ==
- List of members of the Gregorian mission
