= Paulinus of York =

Christian missionary and saint, first bishop of York (died 644)

Saint Paulinus
- Bishop of York
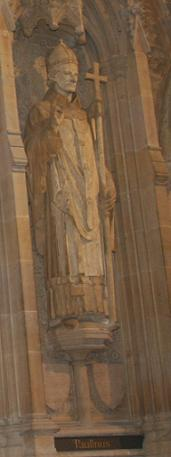
- Statue at Rochester Cathedral
- Appointed: 627
- Term ended: 633
- Predecessor: Founder
- Successor: Chad

Orders
- Consecration: 21 July 625 by Justus

Personal details
- Died: 10 October 644 Rochester, Kingdom of Kent
- Buried: Rochester Cathedral

Sainthood
- Feast day: 10 October
- Venerated in: Eastern Orthodox Church, Roman Catholic Church, Anglican Communion

Paulinus (Note: /pɔːˈlaɪnəs/ paw-LYNE-əss) (died 10 October 644) was a Roman missionary and the first Bishop of York. (Note: York did not become an archbishopric until 735.) A member of the Gregorian mission sent in 601 by Pope Gregory I to Christianize the Anglo-Saxons from their native Anglo-Saxon paganism, Paulinus arrived in England by 604 with the second missionary group. Little is known of Paulinus's activities in the following two decades.

After some years spent in Kent, perhaps in 625, Paulinus was consecrated a bishop. He accompanied Æthelburg of Kent, sister of King Eadbald of Kent, on her journey to Northumbria to marry King Edwin of Northumbria, and eventually succeeded in converting Edwin to Christianity. Paulinus also converted many of Edwin's subjects and built some churches. One of the women Paulinus baptised was a future saint, Hilda of Whitby.

Following Edwin's death in 633, Paulinus and Æthelburg fled Northumbria, leaving behind a member of Paulinus's clergy, James the Deacon. Paulinus returned to Kent, where he became Bishop of Rochester. He received a pallium from the pope, symbolizing his appointment as Archbishop of York, but too late to be effective. After he died in 644, Paulinus was canonized as a saint and is now venerated in the Eastern Orthodox, Roman Catholic, and Anglican Churches.

== Early life ==
Paulinus was a monk from Rome sent to the Kingdom of Kent by Pope Gregory I in 601, along with Mellitus and others, as part of the second group of missionaries sent to convert the Anglo-Saxons to Christianity. He was probably an Italian by birth. The second group of missionaries arrived in Kent by 604, but little is known of Paulinus's further activities until he went to Northumbria.

Paulinus remained in Kent until 625, when he was consecrated as bishop by Justus, the archbishop of Canterbury, on 21 July. He then accompanied Æthelburg, the sister of King Eadbald of Kent, to Northumbria, where she was to marry King Edwin. A condition of the marriage was that Edwin had promised to allow Æthelburg to remain a Christian and to worship as she chose. Bede, writing in the early 8th century, reports that Paulinus wished to convert the Northumbrians, as well as provide religious services to the new queen.

There is some difficulty with Bede's chronology of Æthelburh's marriage, as surviving papal letters to Edwin urging him to convert imply that Eadbald had only recently become a Christian, which conflicts with Bede's account. The historian D. P. Kirby argues that Paulinus and Æthelburh must therefore have gone to Northumbria earlier than 624, and that Paulinus went north, not as a bishop, but as a priest, returning later to be consecrated. The historian Henry Mayr-Harting agrees with Kirby's reasoning. Another historian, Peter Hunter Blair, argues that Æthelburh and Edwin were married before 625, but that she did not go to Northumbria until 625. If Kirby's arguments are accepted, then the date of Paulinus's consecration needs to be changed by a year, to 21 July 626.

Bede describes Paulinus as "a man tall of stature, a little stooping, with black hair and a thin face, a hooked and thin nose, his aspect both venerable and awe-inspiring".

== Bishop of York ==
Map of some of the kingdoms of Great Britain c. 600

Bede relates that Paulinus told Edwin that the birth of his and Æthelburg's daughter at Easter 626 was because of Paulinus's prayers. The birth coincided with a foiled assassination attempt on the king by a group of West Saxons from Wessex. Edwin promised to convert to Christianity and allow his new daughter Eanflæd to be baptised if he won a victory over Wessex. He did not fulfill his promise immediately after his subsequent military success against the West Saxons, however, only converting after Paulinus had revealed the details of a dream the king had before he took the throne, during his exile at the court of King Rædwald of East Anglia. In this dream, according to Bede, a stranger told Edwin that power would be his in the future when someone laid a hand on his head. As Paulinus was revealing the dream to Edwin, he laid his hand on the king's head, which was the proof Edwin needed. A late seventh-century hagiography of Pope Gregory I claims that Paulinus was the stranger in the vision; if true, it might suggest that Paulinus spent some time at Rædwald's court, although Bede does not mention any such visit.

It is unlikely that supernatural affairs and Paulinus's persuasion alone caused Edwin to convert. The Northumbrian nobles seem to have been willing and the king also received letters from Pope Boniface V urging his conversion. Eventually convinced, Edwin and many of his followers were baptised at York in 627. One story relates that during a stay with Edwin and Æthelburg at their palace in Yeavering, Paulinus spent 36 days baptising new converts. Paulinus also was an active missionary in Lindsey, and his missionary activities help show the limits of Edwin's royal authority.

Pope Gregory had planned that York would be England's second metropolitan see, so Paulinus established his church there. Although built of stone, no trace of it has been found. Paulinus also built several churches on royal estates. His church in Lincoln has been identified with the earliest building phase of the church of St Paul in the Bail.

Among those baptised by Paulinus were Hilda, later the founding abbess of Whitby Abbey, and Hilda's successor, Eanflæd, Edwin's daughter. As the only Roman bishop in England, Paulinus also consecrated another Gregorian missionary, Honorius, as Archbishop of Canterbury after Justus's death, sometime between 628 and 631.

== Bishop of Rochester ==
Edwin was defeated by an alliance of Gwynedd Welsh and Mercian Angles, being killed at the Battle of Hatfield Chase, on a date traditionally given as 12 October 633. One problem with the dating of the battle is that Pope Honorius I wrote in June 634 to Paulinus and Archbishop Honorius saying that he was sending a pallium, the symbol of an archbishop's authority, to each of them. The pope's letter shows no hint that news of Edwin's death had reached Rome, almost nine months after the supposed date of the battle. The historian D. P. Kirby argues that this lack of awareness makes it more likely that the battle occurred in 634.

Edwin's defeat and death led to his kingdom fragmenting into at least two parts. It also led to a sharp decline in Christianity in Northumbria when Edwin's immediate successors reverted to paganism. Widowed queen Æthelburg fled to her brother Eadbald's Kent kingdom. Paulinus went with her, along with Edwin and Æthelburg's son, daughter, and grandson. The two boys went to the continent for safety, to the court of King Dagobert I. Æthelburg, Eanflæd, and Paulinus remained in Kent, where Paulinus was offered the see, or bishopric, of Rochester, which he held until his death. Because the pallium did not reach Paulinus until after he had left York, it was of no use to him. Paulinus's deputy, James the Deacon, remained in the north and struggled to rebuild the Roman mission.

== Death and veneration ==
Paulinus died on 10 October 644 at Rochester, (Note: If Kirby's arguments on the date of Paulinus's consecration are accepted, this date would be 10 October 645 instead.) where he was buried in the sacristy of the church. His successor at Rochester was Ithamar, the first Englishman consecrated to a Gregorian missionary see. After Paulinus's death, Paulinus was revered as a saint, with a feast day on 10 October. When a new church was constructed at Rochester in the 1080s, his relics, or remains, were translated (ritually moved) to a new shrine. There also were shrines to Paulinus at Canterbury, and at least five churches were dedicated to him. Although Rochester held some of Paulinus's relics, the promotion of his cult there appears to have occurred after the Norman Conquest in 1066. He is considered a saint by the Roman Catholic Church, the Anglican Communion, and the Eastern Orthodox Church.

Paulinus's missionary efforts are difficult to evaluate. Bede implies that the mission in Northumbria was successful, but there is little supporting evidence, and it is more likely that Paulinus's missionary efforts there were relatively ineffectual. Although Osric, one of Edwin's successors, was converted to Christianity by Paulinus, he returned to paganism after Edwin's death. Hilda, however, remained a Christian, and eventually went on to become abbess of the influential Whitby Abbey. Northumbria's conversion to Christianity was mainly achieved by Irish missionaries brought into the region by Edwin's eventual successor, Oswald.

== See also ==
- List of members of the Gregorian mission

== Citations ==
Christian titles
New diocese	Bishop of York; 627–633	Succeeded by Chad
Preceded by Romanus	Bishop of Rochester; 633–644	Succeeded by Ithamar
