= Honorius of Canterbury =

Archbishop of Canterbury from 627 to 653, Christian saint

Saint Honorius
- Archbishop of Canterbury
- Appointed: 627
- Term ended: 30 September 653
- Predecessor: Justus
- Successor: Deusdedit

Orders
- Consecration: 627 by Paulinus of York

Personal details
- Born: Rome
- Died: 30 September 653
- Buried: St Augustine's Abbey, Canterbury

Sainthood
- Feast day: 30 September
- Venerated in: Eastern Orthodox Church; Roman Catholic Church; Anglican Communion
- Canonized: Pre-Congregation
- Shrines: St Augustine's Abbey, Canterbury

Honorius (died 30 September 653) was a member of the Gregorian mission to Christianize the Anglo-Saxons from their native Anglo-Saxon paganism in 597 AD who later became Archbishop of Canterbury. During his archiepiscopate, he consecrated the first native English bishop of Rochester as well as helping the missionary efforts of Felix among the East Anglians. Honorius was the last to die among the Gregorian missionaries.

== Early life ==
A Roman by birth, Honorius may have been one of those chosen by Pope Gregory the Great for the Gregorian mission to England, although it seems more likely that he was a member of the second party of missionaries, sent in 601. It is not known if his name was given to him at birth or if he chose it when he became archbishop.

== Archbishop ==
In 627, Honorius was consecrated as archbishop by Paulinus of York at Lincoln. Honorius wrote to Pope Honorius I asking the pope to raise the see of York to an archbishopric, so that when one archbishop in England died, the other would be able to consecrate the deceased bishop's successor. The pope agreed, and sent a pallium for Paulinus, but by this time, Paulinus had already been forced to flee from Northumbria. When Paulinus, after the death of King Edwin of Northumbria in October 633, fled Northumbria, he was received by Honorius and appointed to the bishopric of Rochester. The papal letter is dated to June 634, and implies that news of Edwin's death had not reached the pope. This evidence may mean that the traditional date of Edwin's death may need to be moved to October 634. The papal letter may also mean that the traditional date of consecration for Honorius may need re-dating, as the long gap between 627, when he is said to have been consecrated, and 634, when he finally received a pallium, is much longer than usually found. It may be that Honorius was consecrated closer to 634. The papal letter to Honorius is given in the Ecclesiastical History of the medieval writer Bede.

Honorius consolidated the work of converting the English by sending Felix, a Burgundian, to Dunwich after Felix came to the archbishop and made known his desire to go to East Anglia as a missionary. Honorius may have consecrated Felix as the first bishop of East Anglia or Felix may have already been consecrated on the continent. The dating of this episode is unclear, but it is probably close to 631. It is possible that King Sigeberht of East Anglia, who converted to Christianity while he was in exile on the continent, had already met Felix and was behind Felix's journey to Honorius. As well as his help to Felix, Honorius consecrated the first Anglo-Saxon bishop, Ithamar of Rochester, and his successor was also a native of England.

Honorius had few conflicts with the Irish missionary efforts, and admired Aidan, one of the leading Irish clergy.

== Death and legacy ==
Honorius died on 30 September 653, the last of the Gregorian missionaries. He was buried at the Church of St Augustine in Canterbury. He was later revered as a saint, with his feast day being 30 September. His relics were translated to a new tomb in 1091, and around that same time a hagiography of his life was written by Goscelin. In the 1120s his relics were still being venerated at St Augustine's.

== See also ==
- List of members of the Gregorian mission

== Citations ==
Christian titles
Preceded by Justus	Archbishop of Canterbury; 627–653	Succeeded by Deusdedit
