= Theonus =

Theonus has been claimed to be the last British Archbishop of London who "fled to Wales" in 586 prior to the fall of the city of Londinium to the East Saxons during the Anglo-Saxon Invasion of Britain.

Catholic Church titles
| Unknown | Archbishop of London ?–586 | Succeeded by Mellitus as Bishop of London |
