= List of members of the Gregorian mission =

Italian monks and priests sent by Pope Gregory the Great to Britain in the 7th century

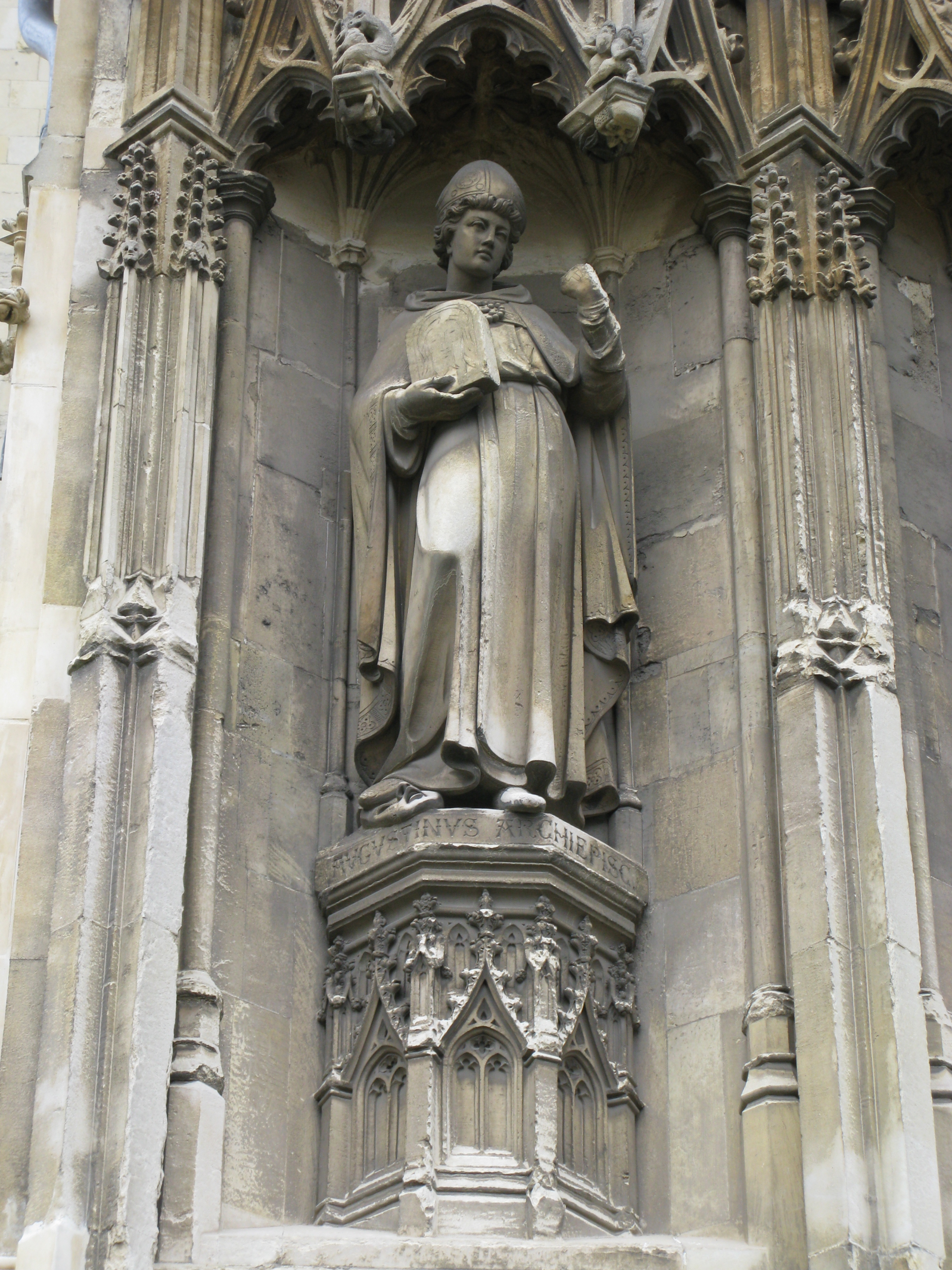
Statue of Augustine of Canterbury outside Canterbury Cathedral in Kent

The Gregorian mission was a group of Italian monks and priests sent by Pope Gregory the Great to Britain in the late 6th and early 7th centuries to convert and Christianize the Anglo-Saxons from their native Anglo-Saxon paganism. The first group consisted of about 40 monks and priests, some of whom had been monks in Gregory's own monastery in Rome. After a long trip, during which they almost gave up and returned to Rome, they arrived in the Anglo-Saxon kingdom of Kent in 597. Gregory sent a second group of missionaries in 601 as reinforcements, along with books and relics for the newly founded churches. From Kent, the missionaries spread to the East Anglian kingdom and to the north of Britain, but after King Æthelberht of Kent's death, the mission was mostly confined to Kent. Another mission was sent to the kingdom of Northumbria when Æthelberht's daughter married King Edwin of Northumbria around 625. After Edwin's death in 633, a pagan backlash against Christianization occurred, and the mission was again confined to Kent; most of the missionaries fled Northumbria because they feared the pagans who returned to power after Edwin's death.

The main source for information on the missionaries is the Historia ecclesiastica gentis Anglorum of the early medieval writer Bede, written around 731. Bede details several of the members of the mission. Another important source of information is the papal registers which list copies of Gregory's letters sent to the missionaries. Neither source gives a complete listing of the missionaries in either group, so a listing of members must be gathered from scattered references in Bede and Gregory's letters. Although it is known that about 40 people were included in the first group, how many arrived in the second group is unknown. The vagaries of the evidence allow only some of the missionaries to be named.

Many of the known members became bishops or archbishops, while most of the remainder became abbots. The lone exception is James the Deacon, who never held a higher office than deacon in the church. Among the archbishops were the first five Archbishops of Canterbury: Augustine, Laurence, Mellitus, Justus, and Honorius; all of them were later canonized as saints. Two other missionaries, Paulinus and Romanus, also became bishops. The last group of missionaries became the abbots of the monastery founded by Augustine at Canterbury, later known as St Augustine's Abbey after Augustine. The abbots included Gratiosus, John, Peter, Petronius, and Rufinianus. As well as the five archbishops, three other members of the mission are regarded as saints: Peter, James the Deacon, and Paulinus.

== Members ==
The date of arrival is either 597 with the first group of missionaries or 601 with the second group. The date of arrival for some members is not known. The third column lists the major ecclesiastical office held by the missionary. The death dates are not always known, in which case approximate dates are listed. The last column notes if the member is regarded as a saint.

Name	Date of arrival in England	Major ecclesiastical offices	Death date	Canonized
Augustine of Canterbury	597	first Archbishop of Canterbury (597–604)	Between 604 and 609	Yes
Gratiosus	Unknown	fourth Abbot of St Augustine's, Canterbury (626–638)	638	No
Honorius of Canterbury	Either 597 or 601	fifth Archbishop of Canterbury (627–653)	653	Yes
James the Deacon	Unknown	Deacon	After 671	Yes
John	Either 597 or 601	second Abbot of St Augustine's, Canterbury (607–618)	Unknown	No
Justus	601	first Bishop of Rochester (604–624) fourth Archbishop of Canterbury (624–627?)	627	Yes
Laurence of Canterbury	597	second Archbishop of Canterbury (604–619)	619	Yes
Mellitus	601	first Bishop of London (604–617) third Archbishop of Canterbury (619–624)	624	Yes
Paulinus of York	601	first Bishop of York (625–633) third Bishop of Rochester (633–644)	644	Yes
Peter of Canterbury	597	first Abbot of St Augustine's, Canterbury (598–605)	circa 607 or after 614	Yes
Petronius	Unknown	fifth Abbot of St Augustine's, Canterbury (640–654)	circa 654	No
Romanus	Either 597 or 601	second Bishop of Rochester (624)	circa 624	No
Rufinianus	601	third Abbot of St Augustine's, Canterbury (618–626)	Before 638	No

== Citations ==
=== General ===
- Brooks, N. P. (2008). "Gregorian mission (act. 596–601)". Oxford Dictionary of National Biography (October 2008 ed.). Oxford University Press. doi:10.1093/ref:odnb/93690. (subscription, Wikipedia Library access or UK public library membership required)
