= Laurence of Canterbury =

Archbishop of Canterbury from 604 to 619, Christian saint

Saint Laurence
- Archbishop of Canterbury
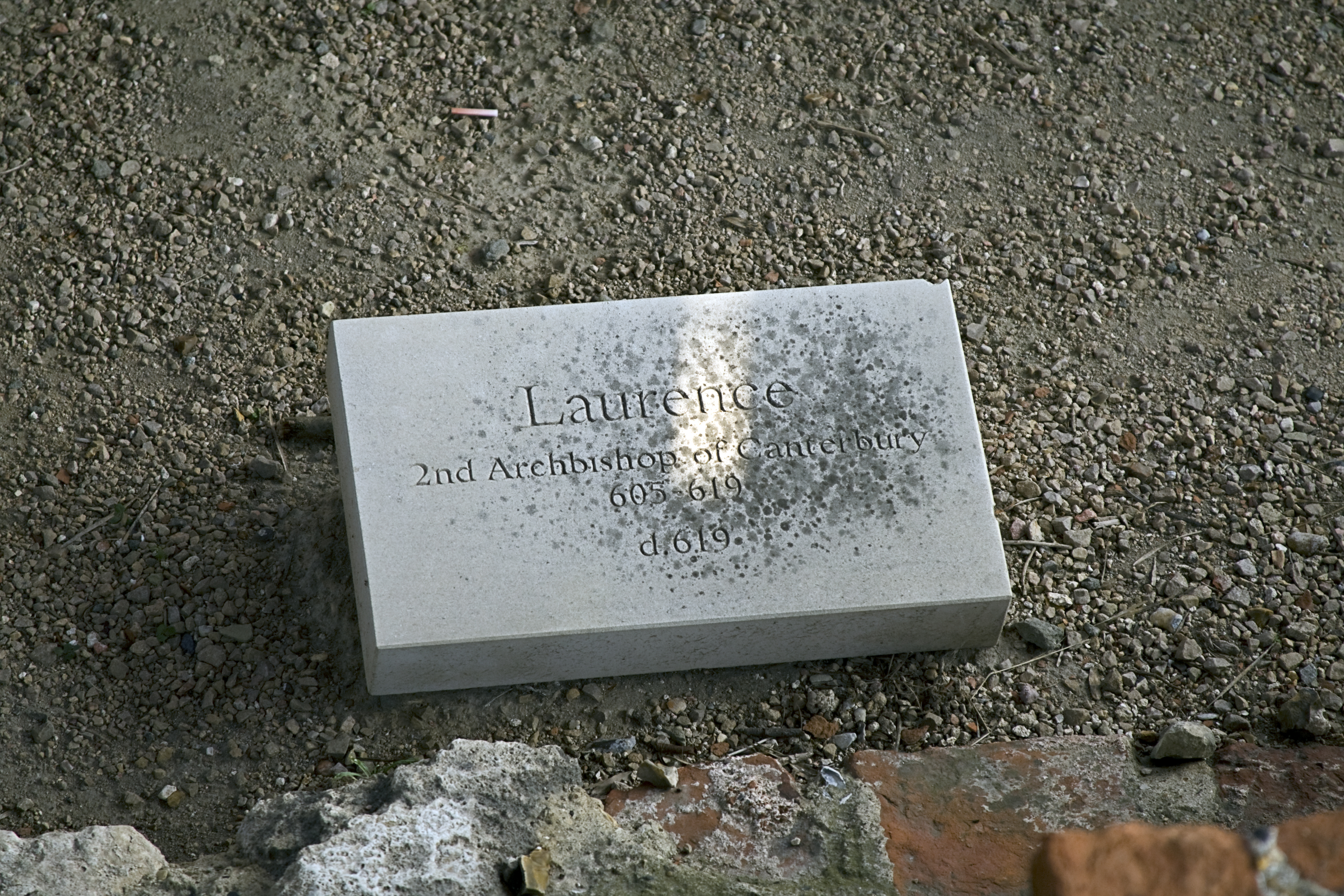
- Gravestone marking the site of Laurence's burial in St Augustine's Abbey, Canterbury
- Appointed: c. 604
- Term ended: 2 February 619
- Predecessor: Augustine of Canterbury
- Successor: Mellitus

Orders
- Consecration: c. 604 by Augustine of Canterbury

Personal details
- Died: 2 February 619
- Buried: St Augustine's Abbey

Sainthood
- Feast day: 3 February
- Venerated in: Orthodox Church; Roman Catholic Church; Anglican Communion
- Canonized: Pre-Congregation
- Shrines: St Augustine's Abbey

Laurence (Note: Sometimes Lawrence or Laurentius) (died 2 February 619) was the second Archbishop of Canterbury, serving from about 604 to 619. He was a member of the Gregorian mission sent from Italy to England to Christianise the Anglo-Saxons from their native Anglo-Saxon paganism, although the date of his arrival is disputed. He was consecrated archbishop by his predecessor, Augustine of Canterbury, during Augustine's lifetime, to ensure continuity in the office. While archbishop, he attempted unsuccessfully to resolve differences with the native British bishops by corresponding with them about points of dispute. Laurence faced a crisis following the death of King Æthelberht of Kent, when the king's successor abandoned Christianity; he eventually reconverted. Laurence was revered as a saint after his death in 619.

== Early life ==
Laurence was part of the Gregorian mission originally dispatched from Rome in 595 to convert the Anglo-Saxons from their native paganism to Christianity; he landed at Thanet, Kent, with Augustine in 597, or, as some sources state, first arrived in 601 and was not a part of the first group of missionaries. He had been a monk in Rome before his travels to England, but nothing else is known of his history or background. The medieval chronicler Bede says that Augustine sent Laurence back to Pope Gregory I to report on the success of converting King Æthelberht of Kent and to carry a letter with questions for the pope. Accompanied by Peter of Canterbury, another missionary, he set off sometime after July 598 and returned by June 601. He brought back with him Gregory's replies to Augustine's questions, a document commonly known as the Libellus responsionum, that Bede incorporated in his Historia ecclesiastica gentis Anglorum. Laurence is probably the Laurence referred to in the letter from Gregory to Bertha, queen of Kent. In that letter, Gregory praises Bertha for her part in the conversion of her husband, details of which Gregory says he received from Laurence the priest. It is known that Laurence returned to England with Mellitus and others of the second group of missionaries in the summer of 601, but there is no record of Peter being with them.

== Archbishop ==
Map of some of the English kingdoms as of about AD 600

Laurence succeeded Augustine to the see of Canterbury in about 604, and ruled until his death on 2 February 619. To secure the succession, Augustine had consecrated Laurence before he died, even though that was prohibited by canon law. Augustine was afraid, though, that if someone did not step into the office immediately, it would damage the missionary efforts in Britain. However, Laurence never received a pallium from Rome, so he may have been considered uncanonical by the papacy. Bede makes a point of comparing Augustine's action in consecrating Laurence to Saint Peter's action of consecrating Clement as Bishop of Rome during Peter's lifetime, which the theologian J. Robert Wright believes may be Bede's way of criticising the practices of the church in his day.

In 610 Laurence received letters from Pope Boniface IV, addressed to him as archbishop and Augustine's successor. The correspondence was in response to Laurence having sent Mellitus to Rome earlier in 610, to solicit advice from the papacy on matters concerning the English Church. While in Rome, Mellitus attended a synod and brought the synodical decrees back with him to Laurence.

In 613 Laurence consecrated the monastery church built by Augustine in Canterbury, and dedicated it to saints Peter and Paul; it was later re-consecrated as St Augustine's Abbey, Canterbury. Laurence also wrote to the bishops in the lands held by the Scots and by the Britons, urging them to hold Easter on the day that the Roman church celebrated it, instead of their traditional date, as part of the Easter controversy. The letter is also preserved in Bede's history. Laurence in 609 stated that Dagan, a native bishop, would not eat with Laurence or share a roof with the archbishop, due to the differences between the two Churches.

== Pagan reaction ==
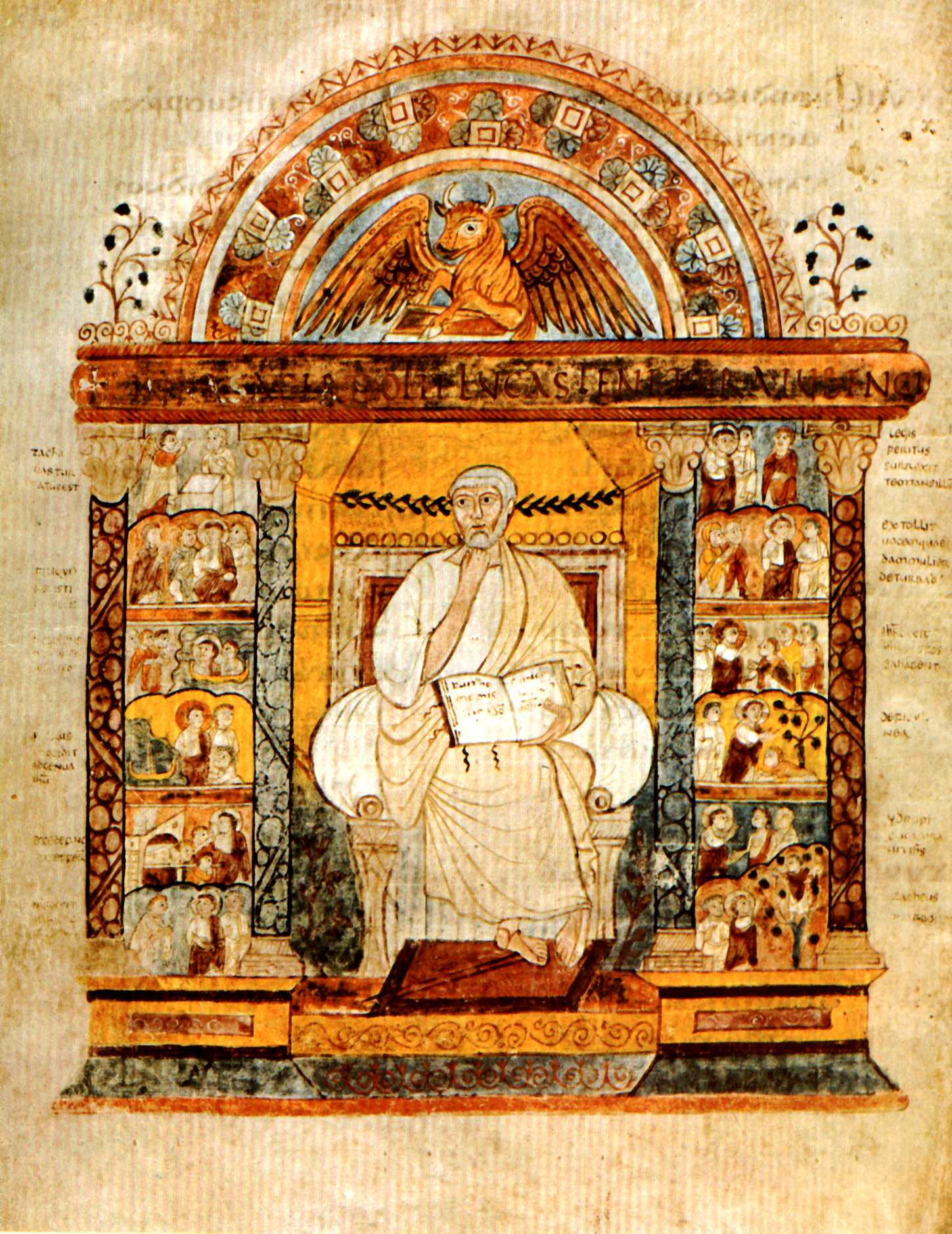
The evangelist portrait of Luke, from the St. Augustine Gospels (c. 6th century), which were probably used by Laurence.

Æthelberht died in 616, during Laurence's tenure; his son Eadbald abandoned Christianity in favour of Anglo-Saxon paganism, forcing many of the Gregorian missionaries to flee the pagan backlash that followed Æthelberht's death. Among them in Gaul were Mellitus, who was Bishop of London, and Justus, who was Bishop of Rochester. Remaining in Britain, Laurence succeeded in reconverting Eadbald to Christianity. Bede relates the story that Laurence had been prepared to give up when he was visited by St Peter in a dream or vision. St Peter chastised Laurence and whipped him, and the marks of the whipping remained after the vision or dream ended. Laurence then displayed them to Eadbald, and the king was converted on the spot. Bede, however, hints that it was the death of some of the leaders of the pagan party in battle that really persuaded Laurence to stay. According to Benedicta Ward, a historian of Christianity, Bede uses the story of the whipping as an example of how suffering was a reminder of Christ's suffering for humans, and how that example could lead to conversion. Wright argues that another point Bede is making is that it is because of the intercession of St Peter himself that the mission continued. David Farmer, in the Oxford Dictionary of Saints, suggests that the whipping story may have been a blending of the Quo vadis story with some information given by Jerome in a letter.

Modern historians have seen political overtones in the pagan reaction. The historian D. P. Kirby sees Eadbald's actions as a repudiation of his father's pro-Frankish policies. Alcuin, a later medieval writer, wrote that Laurence was "censured by apostolic authority". This may have been a letter from Pope Adeodatus I, commanding Laurence to stay in Kent. Kirby goes on to argue that it was Justus, not Laurence, who converted Eadbald, and this, while Justus was archbishop, sometime around 624. Not all historians agree with this argument, however. Nicholas Brooks states that the king was converted during Laurence's archiepiscopate, within a year of him succeeding his father. The historian Barbara Yorke argues that there were two co-rulers of Kent after Æthelberht's death, Eadbald and a Æthelwald, and that Laurence converted Eadbald while Æthelwald was converted by Justus after his return to Rochester. Another factor in the pagan reaction was Laurence's objection to Eadbald's marriage to his father's widow, something that Christians considered to be unlawful.

All efforts to extend the church beyond Kent encountered difficulties due to the attitude of King Rædwald of East Anglia, who had become the leading king in the south after Æthelberht's death. Rædwald was converted before the death of Æthelberht, perhaps at the urging of Æthelberht, but his kingdom was not, and Rædwald seems to have converted only to the extent of placing a Christian altar in his pagan temple. It proved impossible for Mellitus to return to London as bishop, although Justus did resume his duties at Rochester.

== Death and legacy ==
Laurence died on 2 February 619, and was buried in the abbey of St Peter and Paul in Canterbury, later renamed St Augustine's; his relics, or remains, were moved, or translated, to the new church of St Augustine's in 1091. His shrine was in the axial chapel of the abbey church, flanking the shrine of Augustine, his predecessor. Laurence came to be regarded as a saint, and was given the feast day of 3 February. The ninth century Stowe Missal commemorates his feast day, along with Mellitus and Justus. A Vita (or Life) was written about the time of his translation, by Goscelin, but it is mainly based on information in Bede. His tomb was opened in 1915. Besides his feast day, the date of his translation, 13 September, was also celebrated after his death. Laurence's tenure as archbishop is mainly remembered for his failure to secure a settlement with the Celtic church and for his reconversion of Eadbald following Æthelbert's death. He was succeeded as archbishop by Mellitus, the Bishop of London.

== See also ==
- List of members of the Gregorian mission

== Citations ==
Christian titles
Preceded by Augustine of Canterbury	Archbishop of Canterbury; 604–619	Succeeded by Mellitus
