= Peter of Canterbury =

7th-century missionary and abbot in Britain

Saint Peter of Canterbury
- Abbot of St Augustine's Abbey

Personal details
- Died: early 7th century

Sainthood
- Feast day: 6 January
- Venerated in: Roman Catholic Church, Eastern Orthodox Church

Peter of Canterbury or Petrus (died c. 607 or after 614) was the first abbot of the monastery of SS. Peter and Paul in Canterbury (later St Augustine's Abbey) and a companion of Augustine in the Gregorian mission to Kent. Augustine sent Peter as an emissary to Rome around 600 to convey news of the mission to Pope Gregory I. Peter's death has traditionally been dated to around 607, but evidence suggests that he was present at a church council in Paris in 614, so he probably died after that date.

== Life ==
Peter was presumed to be a native of Italy, like the other members of the Gregorian mission. This mission was dispatched by Pope Gregory the Great in 596 to Christianize the Anglo-Saxons from their native Anglo-Saxon paganism. It landed in Kent in 597 and soon converted King Æthelberht of Kent, who gave Augustine the land on which he founded the abbey that later became St Augustine's, Canterbury.

The medieval chronicler Bede records that sometime after the mission arrived in England, probably in late 600, Peter, along with fellow-missionary Laurence, was sent back to Gregory. This deputation was to relay the news of Augustine's successes in Kent and to request more missionaries. They also conveyed to the pope several inquiries from Augustine about how to proceed with the mission, and when they returned in 601, they brought back Gregory's replies to Augustine.

Peter became the abbot of the monastery that Æthelberht founded in Canterbury, originally dedicated to the saints Peter and Paul, but later rededicated as St Augustine's, after the leader of the mission. Bede describes Peter as both abbot and presbyter, a word usually translated as priest.

== Death and veneration ==
Peter drowned while crossing the English Channel on the way to Gaul, at a place called Ambleteuse, near Boulogne. At first he was buried hastily nearby, but Bede reports that after a light illuminated the grave every night, the locals realised Peter was a saint and exhumed him and re-interred him in Boulogne. The actual date of death is unknown, and since his feast day was celebrated on two different days, 30 December or 6 January, that information does not clear up the mystery. Thomas of Elmham, a 15th-century chronicler, reported the date of his death as 1 year, 7 months, and 3 weeks after Augustine's. If this is true, this would give a year of death between 605 and 611. This information, however, is contradicted by the fact that Peter was present at the Council of Paris in 614, convened by Chlothar II. It is possible that he died during his return from the Council of Paris.

Peter is considered a saint, with a feast day on 6 January. His cult was confirmed in 1915. A Vita Petri, or Life of Peter, written by Eadmer in the 12th century, exists in manuscript form, but it is unreliable. There is evidence that Peter was the object of veneration in Boulogne in the 15th century, and a church in that town was associated with Peter, although probably not from the start of his cult.

== See also ==
- List of members of the Gregorian mission
