= Liber beatae Gregorii papae =

Hagiography of Pope Gregory I

The Liber beatae Gregorii papae ('book of the blessed Pope Gregory'), often known in English as the Anonymous Life of Gregory the Great, is a hagiography of Pope Gregory I composed by an anonymous monk or nun at a Northumbrian monastery, usually thought to have been at Whitby, around 700.

== Origins ==
The text was composed during the abbacy of Ælfflæd of Whitby (680–714). Since the monastery was a double house, with both monks and nuns, it is possible that the text was composed by a woman. In the assessment of Alan Thacker, 'although a Latinist of strictly limited ability, whose style and approach was ungrammatical and often naive, he or she was relatively learned, well versed in the scriptures and the works of Gregory and with some knowledge of other Fathers, including Jerome and Augustine. The promotion of Gregory at Whitby represented a significant move within the mainstream of Northumbrian politics and ecclesiastical life'.

== Contents ==
The first part of the text (chapters 1–11) describe Gregory's birth, early career, and his teaching. It proceeds to the earliest account of a story in which Gregory meets some English boys on sale as slaves and decides, on the basis of their beauty, to convert the English to Christianity, and thus to tell of the Gregorian mission to England.

The second part (chapters 12–19) discuss the royal family of Deira and the part of King Edwin of Northumbria in the success of Gregory's mission.

Finally, chapters 20-32 recount miracles which Gregory is supposed to have performed, and list his writings.

== Editions and translations ==
- Colgrave, Bertram (ed. and trans.), The Earliest Life of Gregory the Great, by an Anonymous Monk of Whitby (Lawrence: University of Kansas Press, 1968)
