= Dagán =

6th and 7th-century Irish bishop

Dagán was an Irish bishop in Anglo-Saxon England during the early part of the 7th century.

Dagán is known from a letter written by Archbishop Laurence of Canterbury to the Irish bishops and abbots, in which Laurence attempted to persuade the Irish clergy to accept the Roman method of calculating the date of Easter. Dagán is mentioned in the letter as having recently arrived in Kent. Laurence mentions that Dagán had refused to either share a roof with the Roman missionaries or to eat with them. The full mention of Dagán is "But we have learned from bishop Dagán who came to the above-mentioned island [Britannia] and from abbot Columbanus in Gaul, that they [the Irish clergy] do not differ from the Britons in their way of life. For when Bishop Dagan came to us he refused to take food, not only with us but even in the very house where we took meals." The letter is preserved in Bede's Historia ecclesiastica gentis Anglorum, but as it is recorded there it lacks any closing formulas, so dating it is difficult. Although a date of shortly after 610 has been put forward by Paul Grossjean, the letter could have been written at any time between around 605, when Laurence became archbishop and around 616, when King Æthelberht of Kent died and a pagan reaction against the missionaries set in.

The letter provides no sure dating for when the missionaries met with Dagán, as it does not specify that the meeting took place during Laurence's tenure of Canterbury, merely that it had occurred prior to the letter being sent. This gives a possibility of between the missionaries arrival and Laurence's death. The Gregorian mission arrived in Kent in 597, and it known that Augustine of Canterbury, the leader of the mission, met native Celtic Church bishops at least once, although the meeting did not go well.

Besides the letter, which is the only contemporary record of Dagán, there are mentions of him in Irish annals and in an episcopal list preserved in the Book of Leinster, but none of these other mentions are contemporary to Dagan's lifetime. Nor is there a hagiography on his life. He should not be confused with Daig, the patron saint of Inis Cain, who died around 587. Occasionally Dagán has been claimed as a monk of Bangor, but this appears to stem from confusion with Daig mac Cairill, who was a monk there. The other mentions of Dagán give him a death date of around 640. Later scholars, including John Bale, attributed a letter entitled ad Brytannorum ecclesias, but this is mistaken. Further late records have Dagán moving to Scotland, where he settled at Whithorn and became "ruling cleric" there.

The Stowe Missal as well as the Martyrology of Tallaght, both of which were composed about 830, show that Dagán was revered as a saint at that point. The Martyrology of Tallaght gives a feast date of 12 March for him, and states that the date is his death date. Other martyrologies give a feast date of 13 September, which may mean that there were two different Dagán's who early writers confused.

The historian Roy Flechner has pointed out that it was possible that Dagán's refusal to share a meal or a roof with the Gregorian missionaries was a form of excommunication that is described in some Irish legal books.

Some historians have identified this Bishop Dagán with Dagán of Inber Doile, who died around 640, and was either a bishop or priest at Inber Doile. Objections to this identification include the fact that to have been consecrated a bishop at the canonically minimum age of 30, he would have been quite old at his death in 640 or so. Another objection is that many of the documents mentioning Dagán of Inber Doile do not style him a bishop, although a few do. Definitive proof of whether or not the Dagán the bishop of Laurence's letter is the same as Dagán of Inber Doile is lacking.

Flechner has also pointed out that a letter of Columbanus mentions Dagon, the Philistine fertility god. However, according to Flechner, Columbanus was fond of puns dealing with proper names and may have also intended the reference to Dagon to also refer to Dagán, the Irish bishop mentioned by Laurence.
