= Æthelburh of Kent =

Queen of Northumbria (c. 601–647)

Saint Æthelburh

Queen of Northumbria, Abbess of Lyminge
- Born: c. 601; Kent
- Died: c. 647; Lyminge, Kent
- Venerated in: Anglican Communion; Roman Catholic Church; Eastern Orthodox
- Major shrine: Collegiate Church at Canterbury, England
- Feast: 5 April

Æthelburh of Kent (born c. 601, sometimes spelled Æthelburg, Ethelburga, Æthelburga; Old English: Æþelburh, Æðelburh, Æðilburh, also known as Tate or Tata), was an early Anglo-Saxon queen consort of Northumbria, the second wife of King Edwin. As she was a Christian from Kent, their marriage triggered the initial phase of the conversion of the pagan north of England to Christianity.

== Early life and marriage ==
Æthelburh was born in the early 7th century, as the daughter of King Æthelberht of Kent (sometimes spelled Aethelberht) and his queen Bertha, and sister of Eadbald. In 625, she married Edwin of Northumbria as his second wife. A condition of their marriage was Edwin's conversion to Christianity and the acceptance of Paulinus's mission to convert the Northumbrians.

Æthelburh's children with Edwin were: Eanflæd, Ethelhun, Wuscfrea and Edwen.

Her daughter Eanflæd grew up under the protection of her uncle, King Eadbald of Kent. Bede, Ecclesiastical History (2.20) states that Æthelburh did not trust her brother, or Edwin's sainted successor Oswald, with the lives of Edwin's male descendants whom she sent to the court of King Dagobert I (her mother's cousin).

== Christianity and founding of monastery ==
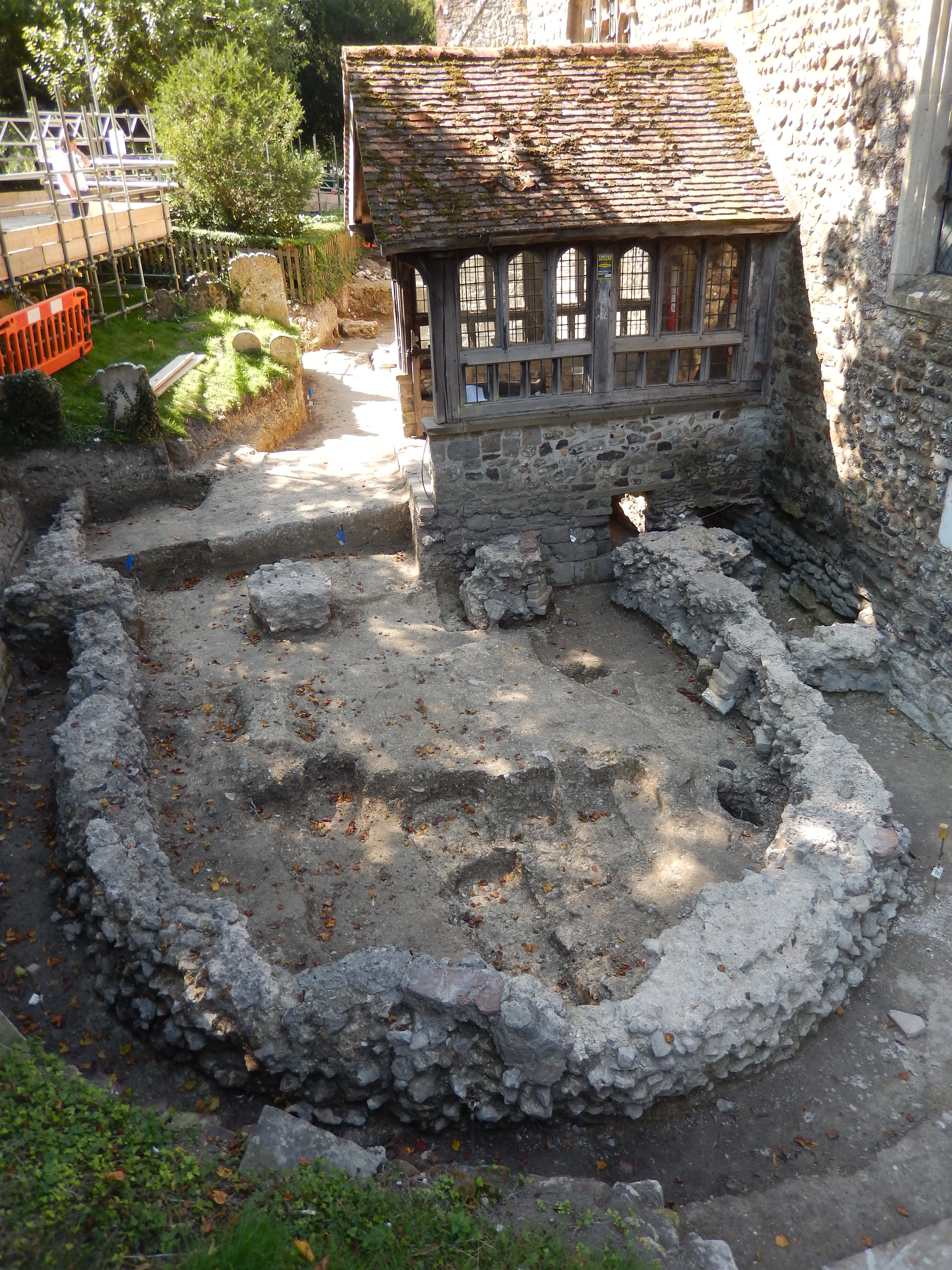
Saxon church at Lyminge founded by Æthelburh in 633, excavated in 2019

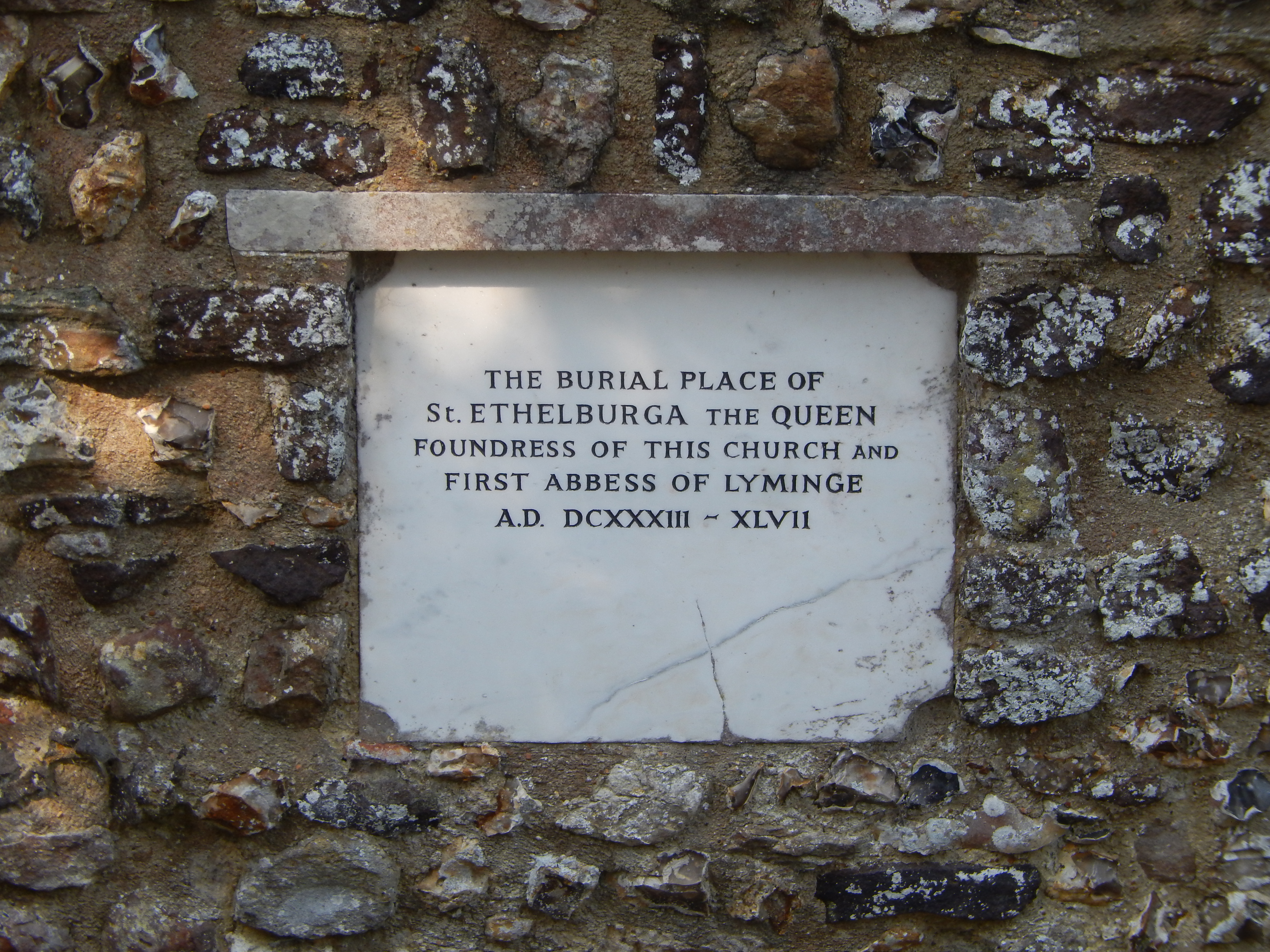
Stone in Lyminge Church marking the burial site of the founder

King Edwin’s conversion was due to his marriage to Æthelburh, who brought her bishop Paulinus with her. Both Æthelburh and her mother, Bertha, received letters from popes Gregory and Boniface respectively, urging them to do their Christian duty by converting their pagan husbands. Their daughter Eanflaed was one of the first to be baptized in Northumbria. After King Edwin was wounded, Æthelburh's alarm caused an early onset of childbirth. Both the mother as well as the infant appeared to be in danger. The prayers of Paulinus were offered for the queen and child. After they recovered, 12 of the royal households, as well as the baby, were baptized by Edwin's permission and request.

According to the Kentish Royal Legend, after Edwin's death at the Battle of Hatfield Chase in 633, she returned to Kent. She then established one of the first Benedictine nunneries in England, at Lyminge, near Folkestone, which she led until her death in 647, and where her remains were later venerated.

Modern research has shown that the buildings at Lyminge were designed to contain a convent of monks as well as of nuns. The church is built from Roman masonry, and was possibly built out of the fragments of a villa, which was customary practice by Anglo-Saxons, or it may have been a Roman basilica.
