= Hugh of Wells =

13th-century Bishop of Lincoln

- Bishop of Lincoln
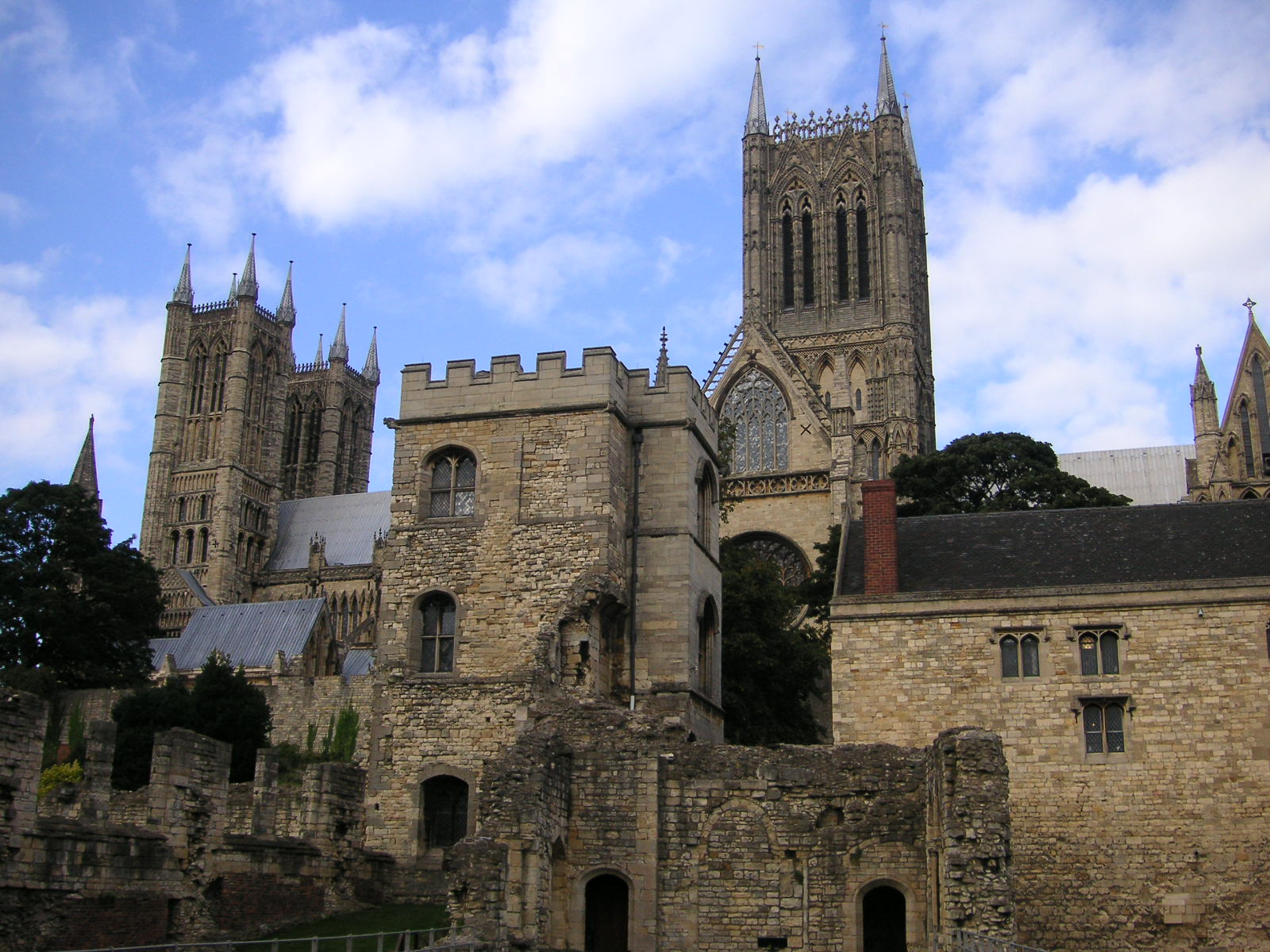
- Lincoln Cathedral, with the ruined Bishop's Palace in the foreground
- Elected: about 14 April 1209
- Term ended: 7 February 1235
- Predecessor: William de Blois
- Successor: Robert Grosseteste
- Other post: Archdeacon of Wells

Orders
- Consecration: 20 December 1209 by Stephen Langton, Archbishop of Canterbury

Personal details
- Died: 7 February 1235 Stow Park

Hugh of Wells (Note: Sometimes known as Hugh de Wells, Hugh of Welles, or Hugh Troteman.) (died 7 February 1235) was a medieval Bishop of Lincoln. He began his career in the diocese of Bath, where he served two successive bishops, before joining royal service under King John of England. He served in the royal administration until 1209, when he was elected to the see, or bishopric, of Lincoln. When John was excommunicated by Pope Innocent III in November 1209, Hugh went into exile in France, where he remained until 1213.

When he returned to England, he continued to serve both John and John's son, King Henry III, but spent most of his time in his diocese. He introduced new administrative methods into the diocese, as well as working to improve the educational and financial well-being of his clergy and to secure the canonisation of his predecessor Hugh of Avalon as a saint in 1220. Although the medieval writer Matthew Paris accused Hugh of being opposed to monastic houses and monks, there is little evidence of the bishop being biased, and after his death on 7 February 1235, parts of his estate were left to religious houses, including nunneries.

== Early life ==
Hugh was the son of Edward of Wells and elder brother of Jocelin of Wells, Bishop of Bath. Hugh's year of birth is unknown, but he was probably an old man at his death in 1235. The fact that he never left his residence from March 1233 until his death implies that he was impaired from old age. He first appears as a witness on documents of Reginald fitzJocelin, the Bishop of Bath, in the late 1180s. After fitzJocelin's death in 1191, Hugh continued in the service of the next bishop, Savaric FitzGeldewin. By the end of the 1190s, Hugh was a canon of Wells Cathedral. Although Hugh's brother Jocelin was given the title of magister, implying that he attended a university, Hugh is never called magister, making it unlikely that he ever received much schooling.

Hugh was a keeper of the king's seal, serving as deputy to Simon of Wells, the Archdeacon of Wells who was Keeper of the Great Seal from around 1199 to 1204. Simon was also a relative of Hugh's and seems to have helped secure positions for both Hugh and Jocelin in the royal administration. Hugh was a royal clerk in the chancery, the royal secretariat, and was named Archdeacon of Wells sometime before 25 April 1204. He held prebends in the diocese of Lincoln and diocese of London as well. His service in the chancery would have involved him in Hubert Walter's administrative innovations during his term as Chancellor.

Besides his episcopal appointments, Hugh was rewarded with two manors in Somerset, including the Treasurer's House in Martock which he made his primary residence, and the right to collect taxes and fines in two hundreds in Somerset. He also served as the royal custodian of the diocese of Lincoln while the see was vacant between 1200 and 1203, collecting the revenues of the see, most of which went to the king while a see was without a bishop. In 1205 and 1206, Hugh was royal custodian for the diocese of Bath, which was similarly vacant.

== Bishop of Lincoln ==
Hugh was elected to the see of Lincoln about 14 April 1209, after a papal command to the cathedral chapter to elect a new bishop, as Lincoln had again been without a bishop since 1206. During the summer of 1209, Hugh, along with his brother, was one of the councilors of King John, urging the king to settle with Pope Innocent III before the pope excommunicated the king. However, negotiations with papal representatives got nowhere, and the king was excommunicated on 8 November 1209. Hugh and his brother Jocelin had continued to support King John until this, two years after many of their fellow bishops had deserted the king, but by late in the year, Hugh left the king's service and went into exile.

The election, meanwhile, had aroused papal suspicions of undue royal influence, and Innocent sent Stephen Langton, the exiled Archbishop of Canterbury, to investigate Hugh and the circumstances of his election. Langton was also to investigate rumours that Hugh was not celibate and had two daughters. The results of the investigation must have been satisfactory, as Hugh was consecrated on 20 December 1209 at Melun. The consecration was performed by Langton. Hugh was in exile in France until he returned to England on 16 July 1213. His only known activity while in exile was the writing of a will, which was dated November 1212 and was drawn up at St Martin de Garenne, near Paris.

Hugh attended the papal Fourth Lateran Council held in 1215 in Rome, along with a number of other English bishops, and both English archbishops. Soon after his return from the council, Hugh served as a royal judge, serving as one of the justices of the eyre for Lincolnshire, Nottinghamshire, and Derbyshire in 1218 and 1219. In 1226, he was once more a royal justice. Later, he was employed by King Henry III as an ambassador, helping negotiate with King Louis VIII of France over the status of Normandy and Poitou. Hugh also worked to secure the canonisation of his predecessor, Hugh of Avalon, as a saint, which occurred in 1220.

== Diocesan affairs ==
In 1222, along with the Archbishop of Canterbury and the Bishop of Norwich, Hugh ordered that all those in their dioceses refrain from contact with Jews. This decree, however, was countermanded by a royal decree to the county sheriffs in the affected dioceses ordering them to imprison any residents who refused to interact with Jews. Besides these activities, Hugh was active in his diocese, including supervising the various monastic houses within it. In 1227, a visitation to Eynsham Abbey resulted in Hugh deposing the abbot. Although the chronicler Matthew Paris accused Hugh of being biased against monks and nuns, and even called him the "untiring persecutor of monks, the hammer of canons, nuns and all the religious", there is little evidence that Hugh singled out monks for persecution. One reason for Paris' dislike of the bishop may have been the fact that the chronicler's own abbey of St Alban's had to compromise with Hugh over two legal disputes, dealing with the right to appoint to various benefices.

Hugh once was credited with creating 300 new vicarages within the diocese, largely on the basis of his surviving documents dealing with this, known as the Liber Antiquus. Further research has shown that a number of the vicarages he was once assumed to have founded were instead earlier foundations that Hugh either augmented or reassessed. Hugh also worked to improve the educational level of this clergy, even refusing to allow some candidates to be installed in benefices because of their lack of education. The bishop also worked to improve the conditions of the poorer clergy in his diocese, attempting to ensure that all the clergy in his diocese had enough to live on. Previously, it was thought that Hugh had sent out a set of articles of inquiry to his diocesan clergy, but these articles are now shown to have been produced by Hugh's successor, Robert Grosseteste.

In the administration of his diocese, Hugh introduced new methods of recording documents. This system was modelled on that which Hubert Walter had introduced into the chancery, with separate registers for each archdeaconry, and registers, or rolls, for charters and memoranda, much like the Charter Roll or Memoranda Roll of the royal chancery. He also undertook a survey of the endowments of the vicarages within his diocese.

Hugh supported the building campaign of Salisbury Cathedral, ordering that money be collected throughout his diocese. Likewise, he ordered similar collections for Daventry Priory, Sulby Abbey and parish churches in his diocese. Not only churches benefited from these sorts of collections, as the bishop offered indulgences to those who helped build bridges at Brampton, Rockingham, and Aynho.

== Death and legacy ==
Hugh died on 7 February 1235, at his episcopal residence at Stow Park. He was buried on 10 February 1235 in Lincoln Cathedral, in the north aisle. In 1233, he had written a new will, which mentions his brother and a niece named Agatha. He left bequests to his family, his household, Lincoln Cathedral, and a number of monasteries in his diocese. What was left after the specific legacies was to be divided between poor religious houses, such as the Barrow Gurney Nunnery, students and teachers at Oxford University, Jewish converts and the poor on the episcopal manors.

Hugh's register of ordinations still survives and is in the Lincoln Cathedral archives. Parts of this were published by Alfred Gibbons in 1888, and others in 1904 by the Canterbury and York Society. These records give not only the name of the person receiving a benefice, but what the clerical status of each new benefice holder was.

== Citations ==
Catholic Church titles
Preceded by William de Blois	Bishop of Lincoln; 1209–1235	Succeeded by Robert Grosseteste
