= Josceline de Bohon =

12th-century Bishop of Salisbury

- Bishop of Salisbury
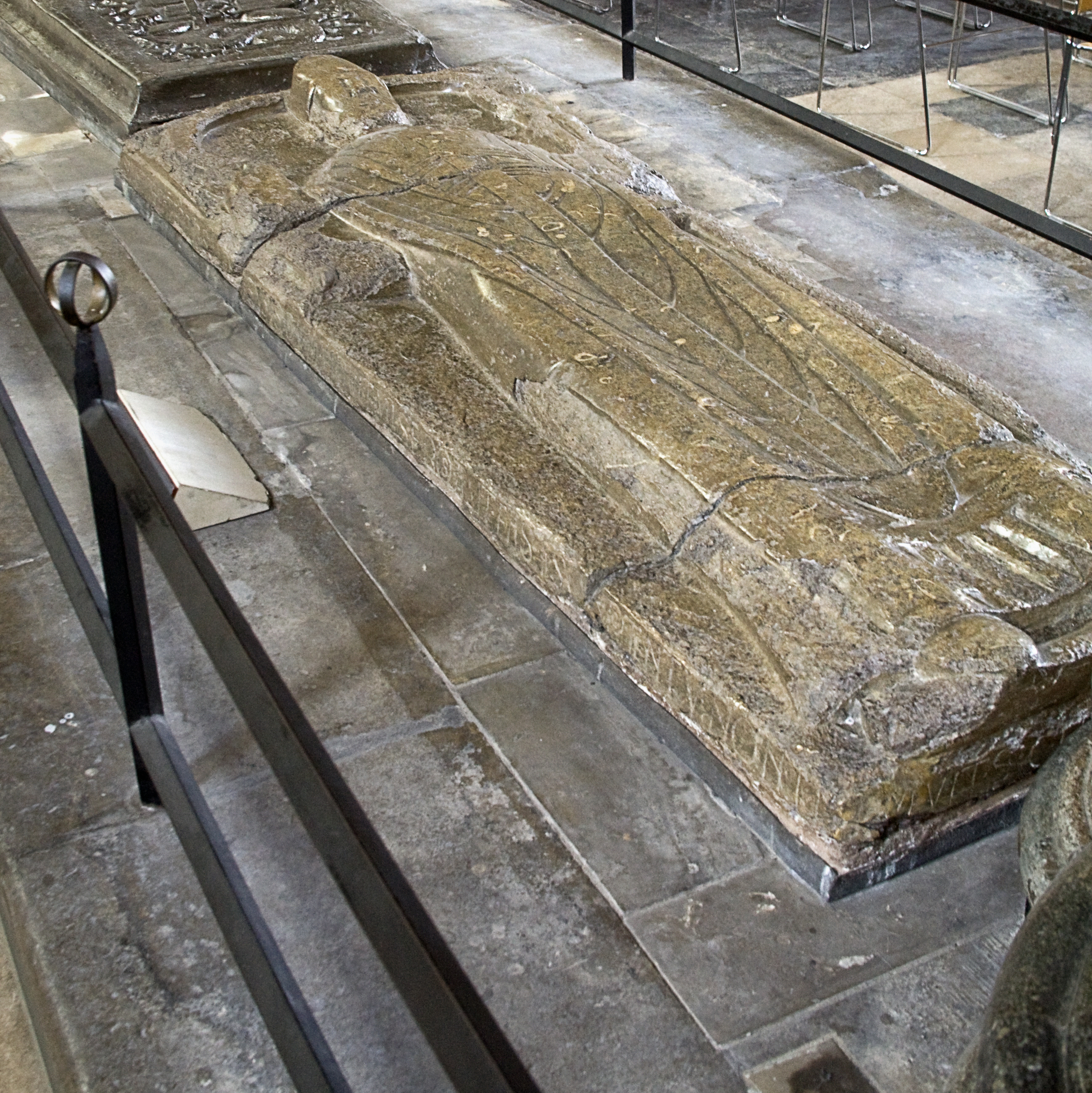
- Tomb in Salisbury Cathedral traditionally thought to be Josceline's
- Appointed: 1142
- Term ended: before 18 November 1184
- Predecessor: Philip de Harcourt
- Successor: Hubert Walter
- Other post: Archdeacon of Winchester

Personal details
- Born: c. 1111
- Died: 18 November 1184
- Denomination: Catholic

Josceline de Bohon or Bohun (c. 1111–1184) was an Anglo-Norman religious leader.

== Life ==
Josceline was a great-grandson of Humphrey de Bohun, one of the companions of William the Conqueror. Savaric FitzGeldewin, who was bishop of Bath from 1192 to 1205, was Josceline's second cousin. Josceline served Henry of Blois, bishop of Winchester, and studied law in Italy at Bologna during the 1130s. He was also an old friend of Pope Alexander III. Joscelin was appointed archdeacon of Winchester in 1139 and consecrated bishop of Salisbury in 1142. His brother was Richard, who served as bishop of Coutances from 1151 to 1179 and who was appointed chancellor of Normandy by King Henry II.

In 1170, Josceline was excommunicated by Thomas Becket, archbishop of Canterbury, ostensibly for having assisted in the coronation of Henry the Young King, son of Henry II. His case was ignored by Rome until after Becket's assassination: he was finally pardoned in 1172.

Josceline's son was Reginald, bishop of Bath. Some sources say that Reginald was born while his father was studying law in Italy, others that he might have been born before his father became a priest.

Josceline resigned his see before his death on 18 November 1184 to become a Cistercian monk at Forde Abbey in Dorset.

== Citations ==
Catholic Church titles
Preceded by Philip de Harcourt	Bishop of Salisbury; 1142–1184	Succeeded by Hubert Walter
