= Abbot of Glastonbury =

List of medieval abbots of Glastonbury Abbey in England

The Abbot of Glastonbury was the head (or abbot) of the Anglo-Saxon and eventually Benedictine house of Glastonbury Abbey at Glastonbury in Somerset, England.

The following is a list of abbots of Glastonbury:

== Abbots ==
Name	Dates	Works	Notes
St Benignus	?458–469		(reputed)
'Worgret'	c.601–?		
'Lademund'	c.663–c.667		
'Bregored'	c.667		
Berhtwald	c.667–676/7		Archbishop of Canterbury 693–731
Haemgils	676/7–701/2		
Beorhtwald	701/2–709/10		
Ealdberht	709/10–718/9	Church of SS Peter & Paul built by King Ine	
Ecgfrith	718/19–?		
Walhstod	729		(rejected by some sources)
Coengils	?–737		
Tunberht	737–?		
Tyccea	754–760		
Guba	760–762		
Wealdhun	762–794		
Beaduwulf	794–800		
Muca	802–824		
Guthlac	824–851		
Ealhmund	851–867		
Hereferth	867–891		(now thought probably to come before Ealhmund)
Stithheard	891–922		
Aldhun	922–?		
Cuthred			
Ælfric?			
Ecgwulf			
St Dunstan	940–957+	Lengthened Ine's church and added a tower. Raised the level of the cemetery and constructed various monastic buildings.	later Archbishop of Canterbury
?Ælfric	occurs after Dunstan in some lists		(probably spurious)
Ælfstan	occurs in some lists after Ælfric		(probably spurious)
Sigar	c.970–975(?)		later Bishop of Wells 975–997
Ælfweard	c.975–1009		
Brihtred (Beorhtred)	1009–?		
Brihtwig (Brihtwine)	c. 1017–1024		later Bishop of Wells
Æthelweard (Aegelweard)	c.1024–1053		
Æthelnoth	1053–1078		deposed by Lanfranc
Thurstan	c.1077–after 1096	Began a new church	1091. Translation of relics of St Benignus from Meare
Herluin	1100–1118	Rebuilt Thurstan's church on a grander scale	
Seffrid Pelochin	1120/1–1125		Bishop of Chichester from 1125 to 1145
Henry of Blois	1126–1171	Built a bell tower, chapter house, cloister, lavatory, refectory, dormitory, infirmary, the 'castellum', an outer gate, a brewery and stables	also Bishop of Winchester from 1129
Robert of Winchester	1173–1180	Built a chamber and chapel	previously Prior of Winchester
Peter de Marcy		1186. New St Mary's Chapel consecrated. Work on Great Church begun.	1184 (25 May). Great Fire
Henry de Sully	1189–1193		supposed tomb of King Arthur and Queen Guinevere discovered in the cemetery c. 1190; Later Bishop of Worcester 1193–1195
Savaric FitzGeldewin	1193–1205		also Bishop of Bath and Glastonbury
(Master William Pica)	(1198–1200)		(elected 1198 but election quashed 1200)
Jocelin of Wells	1206–1219		also Bishop of Bath and Glastonbury from 1206 to 1242
William of St Vigor	1219–1223		
Robert of Bath	1223–1235		Deposed 29 March 1235
Michael of Amesbury	1235–c.1252	Carried work on the choir forward	
Roger of Ford	1252–1261		died 2 October 1261, buried at Westminster
Robert of Petherton	1261–1274	Built abbot's chamber	died 31 March 1274
John of Taunton	1274–1291	Choir completed; west end of nave and galilee built. King Arthur's remains transferred to new tomb 1278.	died 7 October 1291
John of Kent	1291–1303		
Geoffrey Fromond	1303–1322	Spent £1,000 on buildings: completed various parts of the Great Church	
Walter of Taunton	1322–1323	Built pulpitum at west end of choir	died 23 January 1323
Adam of Sodbury	1323–1334	Completed vaulting of nave of Great Church; worked on great hall and built a new chapel on the Tor	Concealed Hugh le Despenser and Robert Baldock, Lord Chancellor at the end of Queen Isabella and Roger Mortimer's Overthrow of Edward II in 1326
John of Breynton	1334–1342	Completed abbot's great hall and worked on various other related buildings including prior's hall	
Walter de Monington	1342–1375	Extended choir by 40 feet, adding 2 bays. Completed abbot's chapel and infirmary. King Arthur's tomb transferred 1368.	
John Chinnock (John Chynnock)	1375–1420	1382. Restored chapel and rededicated it to SS Michael & Joseph; rebuilt cloisters, erected or repaired the dormitory and fratry.	
Nicholas Frome	1420–1456	Finished chapter house, rebuilt misericord house and great chamber; constructed bishop's quarters and a wall around abbey precincts. Probably responsible for the abbot's kitchen.	
John Selwood	1456–1493	Built parish church of St John Baptist. Erected pilgrims' inn.	
Richard Beere	1493–1524	Began Edgar Chapel; built crypt under Lady Chapel and dedicated it to St Joseph; built a chapel of the Holy Sepulchre at south end of nave; built the Loretto chapel; added vaulting under central tower and flying buttresses at east end of choir; built St Benignus' Church and rebuilt Tribunal	
Richard Whiting	1525–1539	Completed Edgar Chapel	Hanged on Glastonbury Tor, 15 November 1539.

== See also ==
- Abbot's Kitchen, Glastonbury

== Sources ==
- Carley, James P. (1988). Glastonbury Abbey'. New York: St. Martin's Press.
- Knowles, David; London, Vera C. M.; Brooke, Christopher (2001). The Heads of Religious Houses, England and Wales, 940–1216 (2nd ed.). Cambridge: Cambridge University Press. ISBN 0-521-80452-3.
- Close Rolls. Westminster: Parliament of England. 1224–1468.
- Smith, David M.; London, Vera C. M. (2001). The Heads of Religious Houses, England and Wales II. 1216–1377. Cambridge: Cambridge University Press. ISBN 0-521-80271-7.
