= Diocese of Bath and Wells =

Diocese of the Church of England

Coordinates: 51°12′37″N 2°38′34″W

Diocese of Bath and Wells Dioecesis Bathoniensis et Wellensis
- Coat of arms

- Flag

Location
- Ecclesiastical province: Canterbury
- Archdeaconries: Bath, Wells, Taunton

Statistics
- Parishes: 477
- Churches: 569

Information
- Denomination: Church of England
- Established: 909
- Cathedral: Cathedral Church of Saint Andrew
- Language: English

Current leadership
- Bishop: Michael Beasley, Bishop of Bath and Wells
- Suffragan: Fiona Gibson, Bishop of Taunton
- Archdeacons: Simon Hill, Archdeacon of Taunton; Anne Gell, Archdeacon of Wells; Charlie Peer, Archdeacon of Bath

Website
- bathandwells.org.uk

The Diocese of Bath and Wells is a diocese in the Church of England Province of Canterbury in England.

The diocese covers the county of Somerset and a small area of Dorset. The Episcopal seat of the Bishop of Bath and Wells is located in the Cathedral Church of Saint Andrew in the city of Wells in Somerset.

== History ==
=== Early name variation ===
Before 909, Somerset lay within the diocese of Sherborne. At this date, Athelm (later Archbishop of Canterbury) was appointed the first bishop of the Diocese of Wells, making the secular church there into the diocesan cathedral. The secular canons at Wells vied with the monks of the monasteries at Glastonbury and Bath for supremacy in the diocese and it was with difficulty that the cathedral retained its status, so much so that the canons were reduced to begging in order to obtain their bread. It was to this impoverished cathedral church that Gisa was appointed bishop in 1060. Under him, grants of land were obtained successively from the kings Edward the Confessor, Harold and William the Conqueror and buildings were constructed for the secular community.

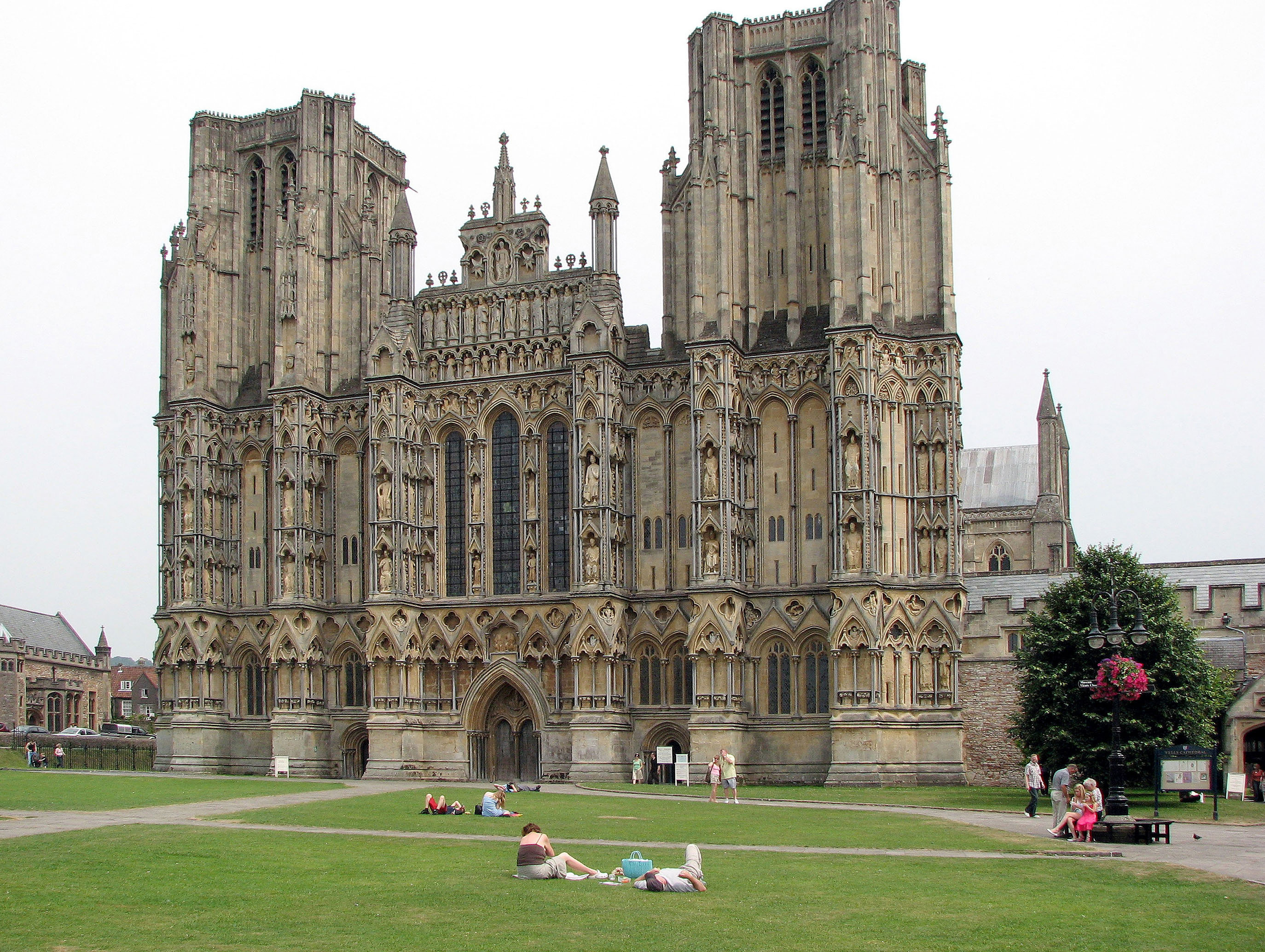
The episcopal seat of the Bishop of Bath and Wells: Wells Cathedral, Somerset. The west front is seen here.

Gisa's successor, John de Villula (1088–1122), moved the see to become the Diocese of Bath in 1090, using the Abbey Church of Ss Peter & Paul as his cathedral and in so doing he regressed the position of the cathedral at Wells. Robert of Lewes, appointed bishop in 1136, enhanced on the position of Wells. As well as rebuilding the cathedral he instituted the arrangement by which although Bath retained precedence, the seat was located in both churches and the bishop was elected by both chapters. However the diocesan title remained the same.

Reginald fitz Jocelin (bishop 1174–91) brought Saint Hugh of Lincoln to England, and Reginald's successor Savaric FitzGeldewin (1192–1205) forcibly annexed Glastonbury Abbey to the diocese in 1197. He moved his seat there, with the approval of Pope Celestine III, and the see became officially known as the Diocese of Glastonbury. The monks of Glastonbury, however, rejected Savaric's authority, and the title Diocese of Bath and Glastonbury was therefore used for all practical purposes until his successor, Jocelin of Wells, a native of Wells itself, renounced the claim to Glastonbury in 1219. Thereupon he adopted the style Diocese of Bath. Although he did not use the name of Wells in his title, his contribution to the city was greater than any other bishop of the diocese: under his authority the cathedral was restored and enlarged, adding the west front, making this the visual signature of the building. Further, he increased the thirty-five canons to fifty and founded a grammar school for the city.

Following his death in 1242 however, the monks at Bath unilaterally elected one of their number, Roger, as successor, in disregard for the chapter of Wells. His appointment received confirmation from King Henry III and the new pope Innocent IV. The chapter at Wells appealed the decision, with the result that the Pope declared, on 3 January 1245, that whilst Roger should remain, he would be bishop of a see thenceforth styled the Diocese of Bath and Wells.

=== Medieval diocese of Bath and Wells ===
The diocese of Bath and Wells proper (Badoniensis et Wellensis) dates therefore from 1245. The diocese contained the three archdeaconries of Bath, Wells, and Taunton. William of Bitton bishop from 1267 to 1274 was renowned for his piety, and his tomb became a place of pilgrimage in Wells. The completion of the buildings was achieved under Ralph of Shrewsbury (bishop 1329–63). Thomas Beckington (bishop 1443–65) was another noted liberal benefactor of the city.

Oliver King (1495–1503) rebuilt Bath Abbey in the late Perpendicular style. The work was begun in 1499 and completed in 1530 under John Clerk. The abbey was the last complete monastic edifice to be completed before the impending Reformation. He was succeeded by Adriano Castellesi (1504–18) who was an absentee bishop, under whom the see was administered by Polydore Vergil the noted historian. Castellesi's successor Thomas Wolsey (1518–23) was also an absentee bishop, held the see concurrently with that of York.

=== Reformation ===
The abbey at Bath was dissolved by King Henry VIII in 1538 during the English Reformation. Thereafter the Church of England bishop, though retaining the old style, had his seat at Wells alone. William Barlow was appointed in 1548. He fled in 1553 on the accession of Queen Mary I, and his successor was the Roman Catholic Gilbert Bourne (1554–59), who was deprived and imprisoned in the Tower of London by Queen Elizabeth, becoming, in 1569, one of the eleven Roman Catholic bishops who died in prison.

=== Nineteenth century ===
The Report of the Commissioners appointed by his Majesty to inquire into the Ecclesiastical Revenues of England and Wales (1835) found the see had an annual net income of £5,946. This made it one of the wealthiest dioceses in England.

=== Contemporary diocese ===
The diocesan offices, the bishops' offices and residences and the cathedral are all located in Wells. The diocese is not referred to as Bath diocese or Wells diocese, but as The Diocese of Bath and Wells.

== Bishops ==
The ordinary of the diocese is the diocesan Bishop of Bath and Wells (Michael Beasley); he is assisted throughout the diocese by the Bishop suffragan of Taunton (Fiona Gibson, whose See was created in 1911.) Alternative episcopal oversight (for parishes in the diocese who reject the ministry of priests who are women) is provided by the provincial episcopal visitor (PEV), the Bishop suffragan of Oswestry. The bishop is licensed as an honorary assistant bishop of the diocese in order to facilitate his work there.

There are two retired honorary assistant bishops licensed in the diocese:

- 2003–present: Barry Rogerson, retired Bishop of Bristol, lives in Clevedon.
- 2011–present: John Perry, retired Bishop of Chelmsford lives in Combe Down.

Additionally, Michael Ball (retired Bishop of Truro), a founder of the Community of the Glorious Ascension, lives in the diocese (in Aller, Somerset.)

== Diocesan structure ==
The diocese is divided into three archdeaconries: Bath, Taunton and Wells. These in turn are divided into 18 deaneries. The deanery of Crewkerne and Ilminster was split in 2012. Sedgemoor was known as Bridgwater until 2000.

Diocese	Archdeaconries	Rural Deaneries
Diocese of Bath & Wells	Archdeaconry of Bath	Deanery of Bath
Diocese of Bath & Wells	Archdeaconry of Bath	Deanery of Chew Magna
Diocese of Bath & Wells	Archdeaconry of Bath	Deanery of Locking
Diocese of Bath & Wells	Archdeaconry of Bath	Deanery of Midsomer Norton
Diocese of Bath & Wells	Archdeaconry of Bath	Deanery of Portishead
Diocese of Bath & Wells	Archdeaconry of Wells	Deanery of Axbridge
Diocese of Bath & Wells	Archdeaconry of Wells	Deanery of Bruton and Cary
Diocese of Bath & Wells	Archdeaconry of Wells	Deanery of Frome
Diocese of Bath & Wells	Archdeaconry of Wells	Glastonbury Jurisdiction
Diocese of Bath & Wells	Archdeaconry of Wells	Deanery of Ivelchester
Diocese of Bath & Wells	Archdeaconry of Wells	Deanery of Shepton Mallet
Diocese of Bath & Wells	Archdeaconry of Wells	Deanery of Yeovil
Diocese of Bath & Wells	Archdeaconry of Taunton	Deanery of Crewkerne
Diocese of Bath & Wells	Archdeaconry of Taunton	Deanery of Exmoor
Diocese of Bath & Wells	Archdeaconry of Taunton	Deanery of Ilminster
Diocese of Bath & Wells	Archdeaconry of Taunton	Deanery of Quantock
Diocese of Bath & Wells	Archdeaconry of Taunton	Deanery of Sedgemoor
Diocese of Bath & Wells	Archdeaconry of Taunton	Deanery of Taunton
Diocese of Bath & Wells	Archdeaconry of Taunton	Deanery of Tone

== See also ==
- List of ecclesiastical parishes in the Diocese of Bath and Wells

== Sources ==
- L. S. Colchester. (1982). Wells Cathedral: A History. Open Books
- The Catholic Encyclopedia
- Church of England Statistics 2002
