= Humphrey de Bohun =

Humphrey de Bohun (pronounced "Boon" in Scottish English or Bo-hun or Bow-hun in French) may refer to:

- Humphrey with the Beard (fl. 1066), fought at the Battle of Hastings
- Humphrey I de Bohun (died c.1123), married Maud, daughter of Edward of Salisbury
- Humphrey II de Bohun (died 1164/5), married Margaret, daughter of Miles of Gloucester
- Humphrey III de Bohun (died 1181), married Margaret of Huntingdon
- Humphrey de Bohun, 2nd Earl of Hereford (Humphrey IV, c. 1204–1275), also 1st Earl of Essex and Constable of England
- Humphrey de Bohun, 3rd Earl of Hereford (Humphrey VI, c. 1249–c. 1298), also 2nd Earl of Essex, a key figure in the Norman conquest of Wales
- Humphrey de Bohun, 4th Earl of Hereford (Humphrey VII, 1276–1321/2), one of the Ordainers who opposed Edward II's excesses
- Humphrey de Bohun, 6th Earl of Hereford (Humphrey VIII, 1309–1361), also 5th Earl of Essex and Lord High Constable of England
- Humphrey de Bohun, 7th Earl of Hereford (Humphrey IX, 1342–1373), also 6th Earl of Essex and 2nd Earl of Northampton, an English noble during the reign of King Edward III
