= Thomas Bitton =

13th and 14th-century Bishop of Exeter

- Bishop of Exeter
- Arms of Thomas Bitton Blazon Escutcheon: Ermine, a fess gules.
- Elected: between 8 October and 30 November 1291
- Term ended: 21 September 1307
- Predecessor: Peter Quinel
- Successor: Walter de Stapledon

Orders
- Consecration: 16 March 1291

Personal details
- Died: 21 September 1307
- Denomination: Catholic

Thomas Bitton (sometimes Thomas de Bytton; died 1307) was a medieval Bishop of Exeter.

== Life ==
Bitton was the nephew of William of Bitton I, who was Bishop of Bath from 1248 to 1264. His brother was William of Bitton II, Bishop of Bath from 1267 to 1274.

Bitton was elected between 8 October and 30 November 1291 and consecrated on 16 March 1292. He died on 21 September 1307. In his will, he left funds to give one penny each to 10,212 poor people. He was also a benefactor of Dorchester Friary, Dorset.

== Citations ==
Catholic Church titles
Preceded by Peter Quinel	Bishop of Exeter; 1291–1307	Succeeded by Walter de Stapledon
