= Cyneweard of Glastonbury =

10th-century Bishop of Wells

Cyneweard
- Bishop of Wells
- Province: Canterbury
- Installed: c. 973 or 974
- Term ended: 975
- Predecessor: Byrhthelm
- Successor: Sigar
- Previous post: Abbot of Milton

Personal details
- Died: 28 June 975

Cyneweard (died 975) was an Anglo-Saxon Bishop of Wells. He was a monk of Glastonbury Abbey before becoming abbot of Milton Abbey in 964. He was consecrated bishop of the Diocese of Wells in about 973 or 974, and died in office on 28 June 975. His death is mentioned in the short Old English poem "The Death of King Edgar", which occurs in the entry for 975 of two of the manuscripts of the Anglo-Saxon Chronicle.

== Citations ==
Christian titles
| Preceded by Byrhthelm | Bishop of Wells c. 973–975 | Succeeded by Sigar |
