= Richard Lush =

Richard Lush may refer to:

- Richard Lush (reformer)
- Richard Lush (writer)
- Richard Lush (sound engineer)
