= Clarembald =

Clarembald or Clarembaud may refer to:

- Clarembald (abbot) (fl. 1155–1173), abbot of St Augustine's, Canterbury
- Clarembald of Arras (d. c. 1187), French theologian
- Clarembaud de Noyers (d. c. 1196), French nobleman
- Clarembaud de Broies, archbishop of the see of Tyre (1202–1215)
- several lords of Chappes:
  - Clarembaud I de Chappes (fl. c. 1040–1090)
  - Clarembaud II de Chappes (r. 1111–1134)
  - Clarembaud III de Chappes (r. 1134–1140)
  - Clarembaud IV de Chappes (r. 1140–1172)
  - Clarembaud V de Chappes (r. 1172–1205)
  - Clarembaud VI de Chappes (r. 1205–1246)
