= William Knight (bishop) =

English bishop and politician (died 1547)

- Bishop of Bath and Wells
- Church: Roman Catholic / Church of England
- Province: Canterbury
- Diocese: Bath and Wells
- Installed: 1541
- Term ended: 1547
- Predecessor: John Clerk
- Successor: William Barlow
- Previous posts: Archdeacon of Huntington; Archdeacon of Richmond; Archdeacon of Chester

Orders
- Consecration: 29 May 1541

Personal details
- Born: 1475/76 London, England
- Died: 1547 (aged 71–72)
- Buried: Wells Cathedral
- Residence: Bishop's Palace

King's Clerk
- In office 1526–1528
- Monarch: Henry VIII
- Preceded by: Richard Pace
- Succeeded by: Stephen Gardiner

William Knight (1475/76 – 1547) was the Secretary of State to Henry VIII of England, and Bishop of Bath and Wells.

Knight was sent to Rome in 1527 to try to get Henry's marriage to Catherine of Aragon annulled. He rebuilt Horton Court in Gloucestershire using ideas from Italian architecture.

== Life ==
Born in London, he entered Winchester School as a scholar in 1487, and proceeded in 1491 to New College, Oxford, where he became Fellow in 1493. He afterwards proceeded D.C.L. 12 October 1531. In 1495 Knight went to court, where Henry VII made him one of his secretaries. He was frequently employed as an ambassador in the reign of Henry VIII. On 3 June 1512 he went with Sir Edward Howard to Spain, and, after storms and sickness, reached Valladolid 18 February 1513. He had received a commission authorising him and John Stile to treat with Ferdinand II of Aragon about the defence of the church. Knight remained at Valladolid till June 1513.

On 3 April 1514 he was at Mechlin on the first of a long series of embassies to the Low Countries. Richard Wingfield and Spinelly were with him (18 April), and on 12 June he was at The Hague with Sir Edward Poynings. In July he seems to have visited Switzerland. He received, on 14 July 1514, a grant of arms; in the grant he is described as prothonotary.

In May 1515 Knight is styled chaplain to the king; in the same year he became dean of the collegiate church of Newark, Leicestershire. On 7 May he was appointed ambassador with Sir Edward Poynings to Prince Charles, to renew the league of 9 February 1505. They had a conference with Cuthbert Tunstall, 23 May, at Bruges, and an audience with Charles at Bergen-op-Zoom on 29 May. He remained in Flanders during the rest of 1515, and found himself short of money. In February 1516 the treaty had been concluded.

He probably came to England in 1516, as he was in that year collated to the prebend of Farrendon-cum-Balderton in Lincoln Cathedral. On 30 December 1516 he was, in company with Charles Somerset, 1st Earl of Worcester, again appointed ambassador to the Emperor, and he had an interview with Charles, 22 January 1517. Throughout 1518 he was English representative to Margaret of Austria in the Low Countries, and sailed home from Calais 15 February 1519. As one of Henry's chaplains and clerk of the closet he was at the Field of the Cloth of Gold in 1520; and seems to have been made prebendary of Llanvair in Bangor Cathedral in the same year.

On 10 June 1520 he was commissioned, with Sir Thomas More, John Hussee, and Hewester, to settle the disputes between the English merchants and the Teutonic Hanse, and went again to the Netherlands. Sir Richard Wingfield, writing from Oudenarde, 28 October 1521, reported that Knight was to take his place as ambassador to the emperor, but it seems that the emperor objected to his low birth, and expressed a preference for Sir Robert Wingfield. Knight made a journey on diplomatic business into Switzerland in 1522; went on an embassy to the empire respecting the wool staple, and was (11 November) admitted archdeacon of Chester. In 1523 he concluded with Charles III, Duke of Bourbon a treaty against France, but was back at Brussels in August. On 11 September 1523 he was appointed archdeacon of Huntingdon. About August 1526 he became secretary to the king.

In 1527, though he complained that he was old and losing his sight, Henry decided to send him to Rome to promote his divorce; Thomas Wolsey thought Jerome de Ghinucci, bishop of Worcester, would have been better suited to the work. On 10 September Knight saw Wolsey at Compiègne, and at his directions went on to Venice to watch for an opportunity to get access to the captive Pope Clement VII. He managed to get a safe-conduct through Gambara the prothonotary, but was nearly murdered at Monterotundo (4 December 1527), and when he entered Rome all he could do was to send in his letters of credence with a note of what the king wished. On 19 December 1527 Knight, while still in Italy, was made canon of Westminster. By the end of December, Henry Jerningham wrote that the secret of Knight's negotiation had not been well kept, and that the Emperor had written to the pope accordingly. Full instructions were then sent to Knight, with a commission to Wolsey and another, which, if signed by the pope, would have empowered them to settle the divorce. On 1 January 1528 the Pope had been set free, and Knight visited him at Orvieto. Cardinal St. Quatuor (to whom two thousand crowns were given) had made some alterations in the commission, and the pope signed it. Knight arrived in London in February 1528 and admitted the failure of this embassy.

He went (13 December 1528) on another mission with William Benet to Anne de Montmorency, to confer about Italian affairs, and was instructed to proceed on again to Rome. On 31 January 1529, however, Stephen Gardiner joined Knight and Benet at Lyon and brought new instructions; Knight went back to Paris and acted through March and April with Sir John Taylor as ambassador; in June Suffolk and Fitzwilliam were with him. On 30 June 1529, Knight, with Tunstall, More, and Hacket, arranged the Treaty of Cambray. He was at the convocation of Canterbury of 1529 and was admitted archdeacon of Richmond on 7 December until 1541.

In February 1532 Hacket and Knight were appointed to treat with the emperor's commissioners about commerce; the embassy did not bear much fruit. Knight held at this time the rectory of Romald Kirk, Yorkshire. On 30 January 1535 Knight was a commissioner for collecting the ecclesiastical tenths, and on 15 October 1537 was present at the christening of Edward VI.

On 29 May 1541 he was consecrated bishop of Bath and Wells, in succession to John Clerk, and he resigned all his other preferments. At Wells Thomas Fuller relates that he built a market cross with the assistance of Dean Woolman. He died in 1547 at Wiveliscombe, Somerset, and was buried in Wells Cathedral next to Sugar's Chapel, where a pulpit which he had erected and which bears his arms served as a monument. He was a patron of Henry Cole. When in London Knight lived in a house in Cannon Row, Westminster, afterwards (1536) assigned, in accordance with an act of 27 Henry VIII, to the bishops of Norwich. By his will he left money to Winchester and New Colleges.

Political offices
Preceded by Richard Pace	Secretary of State; 1526–1528	Succeeded by Stephen Gardiner
Church of England titles
Preceded by John Clerk	Bishop of Bath and Wells; 1541–1547	Succeeded by William Barlow
