= William of Bitton =

13th-century Bishop of Bath and Wells

- Bishop of Bath and Wells
- Arms of Bitton Blazon Escutcheon: Ermine, a fess gules.
- Elected: c. 24 February 1248
- Term ended: 3 April 1264
- Predecessor: Roger of Salisbury
- Successor: Walter Giffard
- Other post: Archdeacon of Wells

Orders
- Consecration: 24 June 1248

Personal details
- Born: probably Bitton, Gloucestershire
- Died: 3 April 1264
- Buried: Lady Chapel, Wells Cathedral

William of Bitton (Note: Sometimes known as William of Bitton I or William Button) (died 1264) was a medieval English Bishop of Bath and Wells.

== Life ==
William was probably born in Bitton in Gloucestershire. He was a relative of Walter Giffard and uncle of William of Bitton II, his two successors in the office of Bishop of Bath and Wells. He was also uncle of Thomas of Bitton, precentor, archdeacon and dean of Wells, and Bishop of Exeter.

William was an official of Jocelin of Wells in 1231 and was subdean of Wells in 1233. He was named Archdeacon of Wells by 7 May 1238 and held the office until he was elected bishop. During the election of his predecessor, he championed the cause of the canons of Wells, who had been excluded from the election of Roger of Salisbury in 1244.

William was elected about 24 February 1248 and consecrated 14 June 1248. In 1251 he signed the proclamation of excommunication against any who did not observe the clauses of Magna Carta dealing with ecclesiastical rights. He served King Henry III of England by going to Spain in 1253 to bring back a prospective daughter-in-law for the king. In 1257, the bishops made specific reference to William's conflict with the Abbot of Glastonbury in their communications with the king. But mainly, he worked in his diocese, as he issued rules and regulations in the diocese dealing with liturgical and judicial matters for both the laity and clergy. However, he lost a long fight with the abbot of Glastonbury Roger Forde over the right of the bishop to visit and regulate the affairs of Glastonbury Abbey, and by the end of his term as bishop, the abbey was independent of the diocese in all but name.

William died on 3 April 1264. He was buried in the Lady Chapel at Wells Cathedral on 8 April 1264. His tomb had disappeared by the 18th century. He should not be confused with his nephew the second William of Bitton who was also Bishop of Bath and Wells, but who died in 1274.

== Citations ==
Catholic Church titles
Preceded by Roger of Salisbury	Bishop of Bath and Wells; 1248–1264	Succeeded by Walter Giffard
