= Gilbert Bourne =

Bishop of Bath and Wells from 1554 to 1559

The Right Reverend Gilbert Bourne
- Bishop of Bath and Wells
- Church: Church of England/Roman Catholic
- See: Diocese of Bath and Wells
- In office: 1554–1559
- Predecessor: William Barlow
- Successor: Gilbert Berkeley
- Previous post: Archdeacon of Bedford

Personal details
- Died: 10 September 1569 Silverton, Devon

Gilbert Bourne (date of birth unknown; d. 10 September 1569 at Silverton, Devon) was the last Roman Catholic Bishop of Bath and Wells, England.

== Life to the death of Mary I ==
Bourne was son of Philip Bourne, of Worcestershire. Entering the University of Oxford in 1524, he became a Fellow of All Souls in 1531, proceeded in Arts in 1532, and in 1543 was admitted to the degree of Bachelor of Divinity, having in 1541 been named prebendary of Worcester, on the suppression of the old monastic chapter there.

Moving to London in 1545, Bourne became a prebendary of St Paul's Cathedral, and in 1549 Archdeacon of Bedford with the benefice of rector of High Ongar in Essex. At the time, the holding of such preferments involved acceptance of the Church of England as brought into being under King Henry VIII and his son Edward VI. Soon after Queen Mary I's accession, while preaching at St Paul's Cross, Bourne was pulled violently from the pulpit and narrowly escaped a dagger which a fanatic hurled at him. On being appointed to the Bishopric of Bath and Wells, Bourne received absolution from Cardinal Reginald Pole, the papal legate, by letters dated 17 March 1554, from all censures incurred in the time of schism, and on 1 April was consecrated with five others by Bishop Bonner, assisted by Bishop Stephen Gardiner and Bishop Cuthbert Tunstall.

During Bourne's brief episcopate, he seems to have taken no part in the Marian Persecutions, as Francis Godwin admits, he always used kindness rather than severity. There is no record of religious executions in his diocese: he condemned Richard Lush to death, but there is no evidence the sentence was carried out. Queen Mary showed her high esteem for him by naming him Lord President of the Council of Wales.

== Under Elizabeth ==
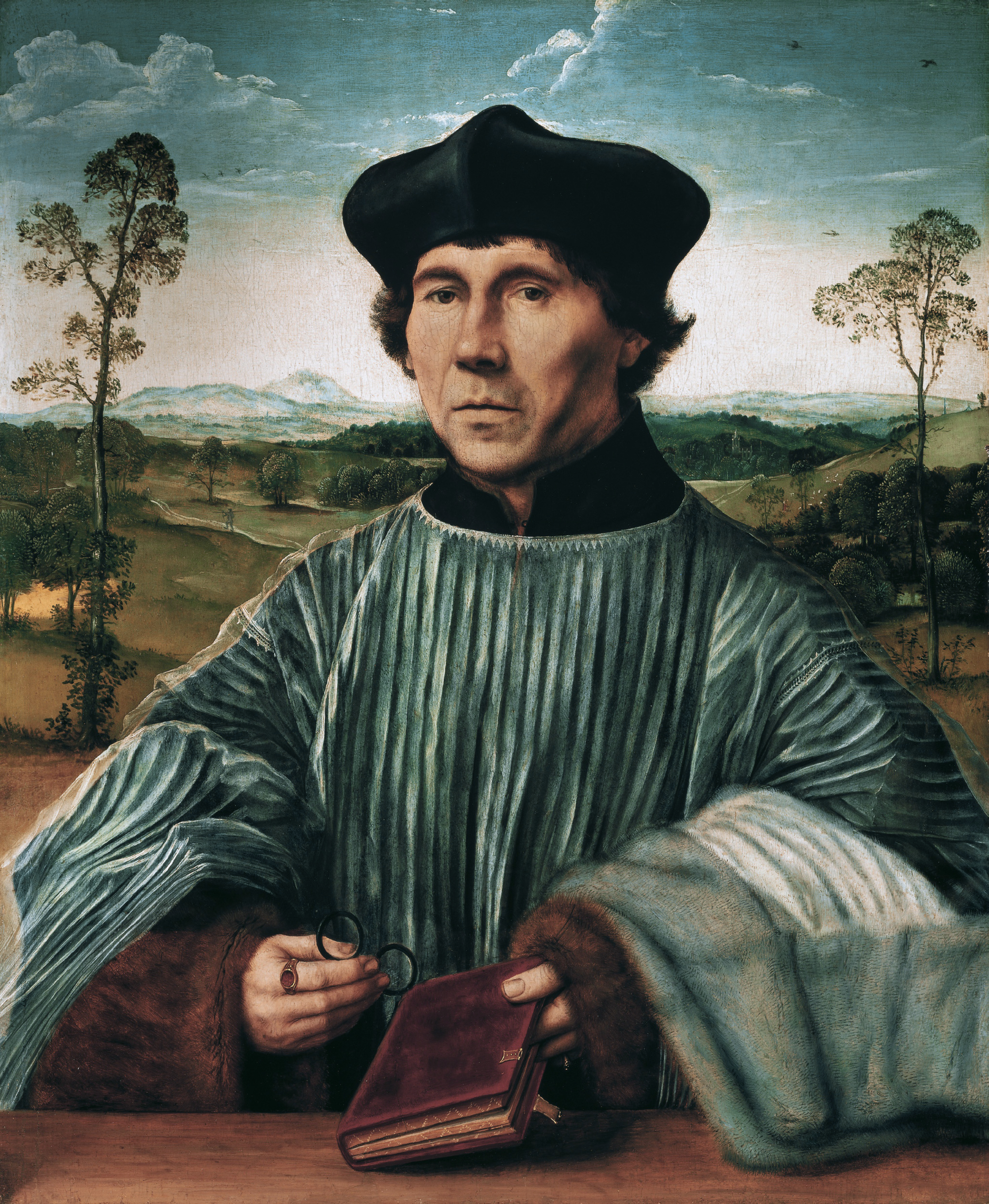
Stephen Gardiner, Bishop of Winchester and an ally of Bourne.

At the beginning of Elizabeth's reign Bourne was kept away from London by illness and official duties, and he is only mentioned once as present in the Parliament. For this reason he was one of the last bishops to be deposed, and he was even named amongst those first commissioned to consecrate Matthew Parker, appointed primate of the queen's new hierarchy. Although Queen Elizabeth I expressed herself content with his service, on his refusal to take the Oath of Supremacy, which four Somerset justices were commissioned on 18 October 1559 to administer, his deprivation of office quickly followed.

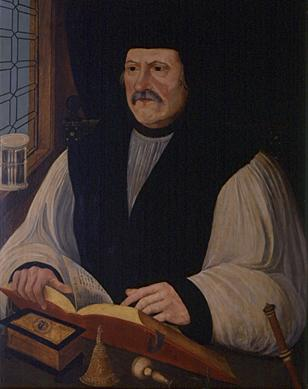
Matthew Parker, Archbishop of Canterbury, removed Bourne from his office.

For a few months Bourne was left in Somerset, apparently as a prisoner on parole; but on 31 May 1560 he received a summons to appear within twelve days before Parker and the Commissioners in London. He set out, as his reply to Parker shows, well knowing what to expect, and on 18 June was committed to the Tower of London as a close prisoner, joining five other bishops already confined there. He remained in the Tower for three years, for most of that time in solitary confinement, when an outbreak of the plague in September 1563 caused him and his companions to be for a time transferred into the keeping of certain of their Anglican successors in office; Bourne himself was apparently committed to that of Bishop Nicholas Bullingham of Lincoln.

There began that continual "tossing and shifting" of the deposed prelates "from one keeper to another, from one prison to another", which William Allen describes as one part of their "martyrdom". The Council, in June, 1565, sent them all back to the Tower, although a little later in a letter of Parker (January 1566), Bullingham is mentioned as though again for a time Bishop Bourne's actual or intended keeper, while all the captive prelates continue during the next two years to be referred to as then in the public prisons. After nearly ten years of this, Bourne died, at Silverton in Devonshire, having been there committed (apparently not long) to the custody of George Carew, Archdeacon of Exeter and Dean of Windsor. There he was buried in the church.

He is one of the "Eleven Bishops", a picture of whose prison was allowed by Pope Gregory XIII to be erected in the English College church at Rome, amongst pictures of the English Saints and Martyrs, with an inscription declaring that they "died for their confession of the Roman See and Catholic faith, worn out by the miseries of their long imprisonment".

Political offices
| Preceded by Earl of Pembroke | Lord President of Wales and the Marches; 1558–1559 | Succeeded by Lord Williams of Thame |
Catholic Church titles
| Preceded by William Barlow | Bishop of Bath and Wells; 1554–1559 | Succeeded by Gilbert Berkeley |
