= Lyfing (archbishop of Canterbury) =

Archbishop of Canterbury from 1013 to 1020

- Archbishop of Canterbury
- Appointed: 1013
- Term ended: 12 June 1020
- Predecessor: Ælfheah
- Successor: Æthelnoth
- Other posts: Abbot of Chertsey Abbey; Bishop of Wells

Orders
- Consecration: 1013

Personal details
- Born: Ælfstan
- Died: 12 June 1020
- Buried: Canterbury Cathedral

Lyfing (Note: Sometimes Living, or Ælfstan, or Æthelstan) (died 12 June 1020) was an Anglo-Saxon Bishop of Wells and Archbishop of Canterbury. He was abbot of Chertsey Abbey before becoming bishop at Wells. His appointment to Canterbury came at a time of Danish invasions of England, and he was unable to act as archbishop for a time due to Danish activity. When Cnut, the Danish king, became king of England, Lyfing likely consecrated the new king. Lyfing was known as a wise man and gave gifts to his church and oversaw repairs to his cathedral before his death in 1020.

== Early career ==
Lyfing was born "Ælfstan". He was abbot of Chertsey Abbey from about 989. He became Bishop of Wells in 998 or 999, and in 1013 King Æthelred the Unready appointed him to the see of Canterbury.

== Archbishop ==
Lyfing was unable to go to Rome for his pallium, the symbol of archiepiscopal authority, during King Æthelred's reign, for every bishop that was consecrated during the remainder of the king's reign was consecrated by Archbishop Wulfstan of York. The reason for his inability to secure the pallium was most likely the disorder in England caused by Danish raids and attempts at conquest of the kingdom. By 1018, however, he was acting as archbishop, having returned to England from Rome with letters from Pope Benedict VIII, some of which were for the new king, Cnut, who became king in 1016. These letters exhorted the new king to strive to be a better ruler. As Archbishop of Canterbury, Lyfing crowned two English kings: Ethelred's son Edmund Ironside in 1016 and Cnut in 1017. When the coronation of Cnut actually took place and where is unclear, but the 12th-century writer Ralph of Diceto states that Lyfing carried out the ceremony. He seems to have gone to Rome on behalf of Cnut at least once.

A scribe at Canterbury Cathedral records a story that Lyfing was discussing church freedom with Cnut when the king offered to give the archbishop a new charter guaranteeing the church's freedom. Lyfing is said to have declined, lamenting that he and the church had a number of charters on those lines, but that did not mean anything so why should another help the situation. The king is then said to have confirmed the church's freedom in the same manner as previous kings had. Lyfing also secured from the king lands for the cathedral as well as himself, giving gifts to it to decorate the cathedral. He also oversaw the restoration of the cathedral's roof. The Lanalet Pontifical, an 11th-century pontifical in manuscript produced in England, has a note that it was once owned by Bishop "Lyfing", and it is possible that the Lyfing referred was the archbishop of Canterbury, although Lyfing who was successively Bishop of Crediton and Bishop of Worcester is also a possible owner.

== Death and legacy ==
Lyfing died on 12 June 1020. He was buried in Canterbury Cathedral, and after his death his remains were first moved to the gallery of the north transept during the time of Archbishop Lanfranc, before eventually being buried near the altar of St Martin. The Anglo-Saxon Chronicle called him "a sagacious man, both before God and before the world".

== Citations ==
Christian titles
Preceded by Ælfwine	Bishop of Wells c. 999–1013	Succeeded by Æthelwine
Preceded by Ælfheah	Archbishop of Canterbury; 1013–1020	Succeeded by Æthelnoth
