= Ælfwine of Wells =

10th-century Bishop of Wells

Ælfwine
- Bishop of Wells
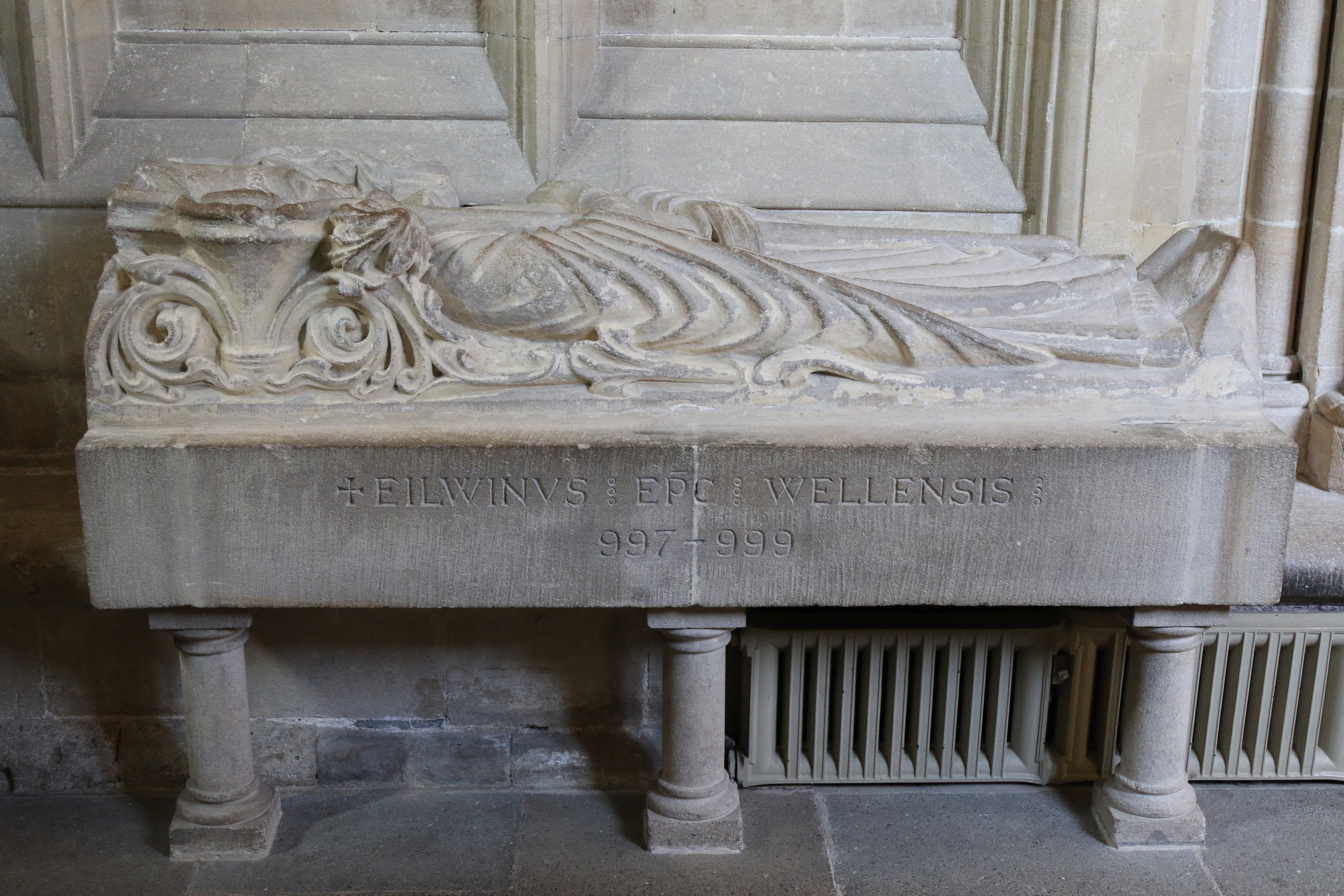
- Tomb in Wells Cathedral
- Elected: c. 997
- Term ended: c. 998
- Predecessor: Sigar
- Successor: Lyfing

Orders
- Consecration: c. 997

Personal details
- Died: c. 998
- Denomination: Christian

Ælfwine (or Aelfwin) was an Anglo-Saxon Bishop of Wells. He was consecrated about 997, and died around 998.

== Citations ==
Christian titles
Preceded by Sigar	Bishop of Wells c. 997–c. 998	Succeeded by Lyfing
