= Peter Quinel =

13th-century Bishop of Exeter

- Bishop of Exeter
- Arms of Peter Quinel, Bishop of Exeter: Azure, a cross argent between two roses in chief and two fleurs-de-lys in base or
- Elected: between 7 August and 7 October 1280
- Term ended: October 1291
- Predecessor: Walter Branscombe
- Successor: Thomas Bitton
- Other post: Archdeacon of St David's

Orders
- Consecration: 10 November 1280 by Richard of Gravesend

Personal details
- Born: c. 1230
- Died: October 1291 (aged 60–61)
- Buried: Exeter Cathedral
- Denomination: Catholic

Peter Quinel (Note: Or Peter de Quivel, or Quivil) (c. 1230–1291) was a medieval Bishop of Exeter. He became a canon of Exeter Cathedral in 1276 and his episcopate began in 1280 and continued until he died in 1291. He issued a set of rules governing the clergy in his diocese and the required furnishing of churches and continued the rebuilding efforts at Exeter Cathedral.

== Life ==
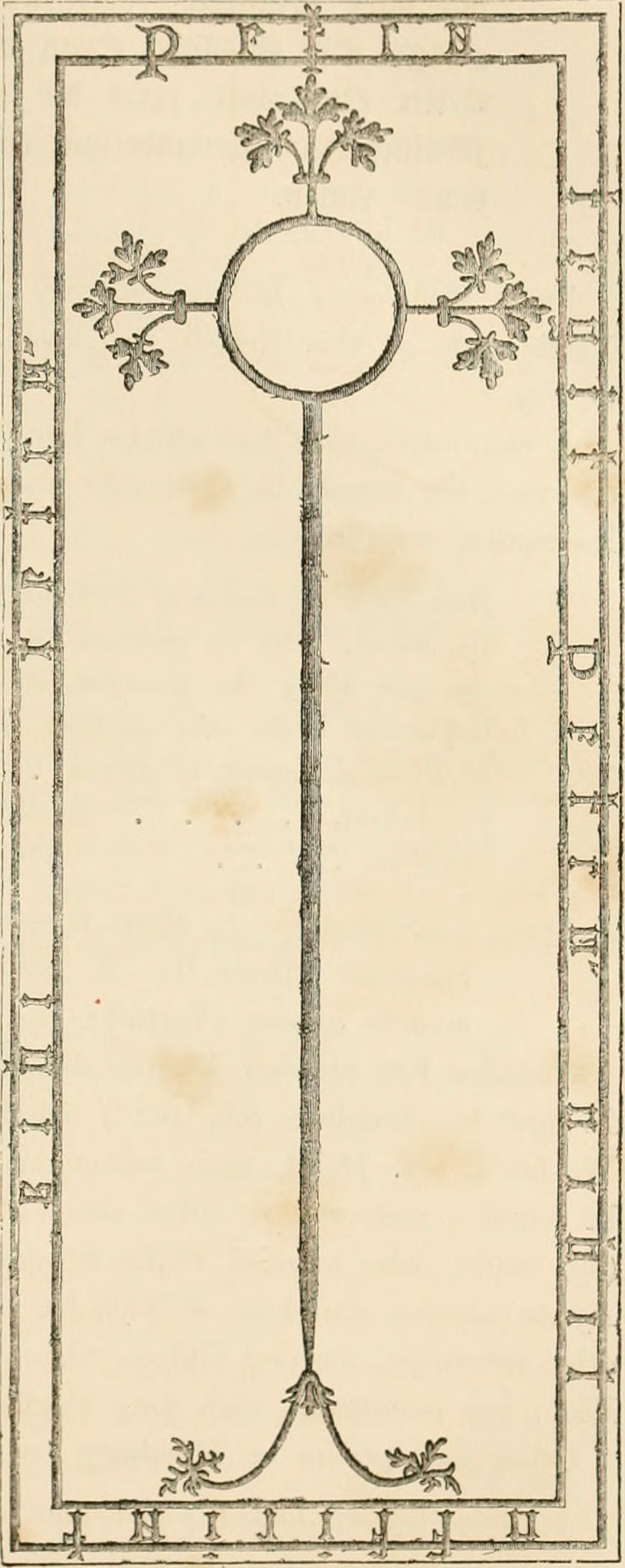
Peter Quinel's tomb slab

Quinel was born about 1230, to Peter Quinel and his wife Helewis. He may have been educated at a university, because in 1262 he was given the title of master, which implies a university education.

Quinel had the office of archdeacon of St David's in 1263, and later became a canon of Exeter Cathedral in 1276.

Quinel was elected between 7 August and 7 October 1280 and consecrated on 10 November 1280. His consecration took place at Canterbury Cathedral and was performed by Richard of Gravesend who was Bishop of London.

While bishop, Quinel legislated that clerics' clothes should be all one colour, gave detailed lists of the required furnishings of a church, and ordered that any uneducated clergy should be deprived of office. These were part of a set of statutes that Quinel issued in 1287 for his diocese. He also continued the rebuilding efforts at Exeter Cathedral, and was generally credited with deciding to rework the cathedral along Gothic lines.

Quinel died in October 1291, probably on the 1st. He was buried in the lady chapel in his cathedral, where his tomb slab is still extant.

== See also ==
- Bishop of Exeter
- Exeter Cathedral
- Archdeacon of St David's
- Richard of Gravesend
- Canterbury Cathedral
- Gothic architecture

== Citations ==
Catholic Church titles
Preceded by Walter Branscombe	Bishop of Exeter; 1280–1291	Succeeded by Thomas Bitton
