= Richard Lush (reformer) =

16th-century English Protestant reformer

Richard Lush was a 16th-century English Protestant reformer and presumed martyr.

He was from Chew Stoke, and was condemned to death for heresy by Gilbert Bourne, bishop of Bath and Wells. John Foxe, in his Actes and Monumentes, lists the nine items in the charge against Lush:

1. Denying the "verity of the body & blood of Christ in the Sacrament of the Altar"
2. Denying auricular confession
3. Affirming only three sacraments (baptism, the Lord's Supper, and marriage)
4. "Refusing to call the Lord's Supper by the name of the Sacrament of the altar"
5. Denying Purgatory
6. Believing that kneeling to images is idolatry
7. Believing that "that they which were burnt of late for religion, died Gods servants and good Martyrs"
8. Rejecting clerical celibacy
9. "Denying the universal and catholic church" (Foxe adds, "meaning belike the Church of Rome")

Foxe could not find a record of his death, and notes that he was "burnt and executed, vnlesse peraduenture in þe mean season he dyed or was made away in the prison: wherof I haue no certeinty to expresse." William Hunt says that "it may be taken for granted that he was not put to death," while Thomas Fuller suggested that, "it is probable that this poor Isaac, thus bound to the altar, was afterward sacrificed, except some intervening angel stayed the stroke of the sword."
