= Sigar of Wells =

10th-century Bishop of Wells

- Bishop of Wells
- Elected: 975
- Term ended: c. 996
- Predecessor: Cynweard
- Successor: Ælfwine
- Other post: Abbot of Glastonbury

Orders
- Consecration: 975

Personal details
- Died: c. 996
- Denomination: Christian

Sigar (or Sigegar; died c. 996) was an Anglo-Saxon Bishop of Wells.

Sigar was a monk at Winchester before becoming abbot of Glastonbury Abbey about 970. He was consecrated in 975 and died 28 June in either 996 or 997.

== Citations ==
Christian titles
Preceded by Cynweard	Bishop of Wells; 975–c. 978	Succeeded by Ælfwine
