= Gilbert Berkeley =

Bishop of Bath and Wells from 1560 to 1581

Gilbert Berkeley (1501–1581) was an English churchman, a Marian exile during the reign of Bloody Mary, and then Bishop of Bath and Wells.

== Life ==
He took the degree of B.D. at Oxford about 1539, according to Anthony à Wood. He was rector of Attleborough in 1544, according to 19th-century sources, though the Dictionary of National Biography doubts that there is evidence of his early preferments. During the reign of Mary I of England he was in exile at Frankfurt.

After the deprivation of Gilbert Bourne, bishop of Bath and Wells, license of election was granted 11 January 1560. Berkeley was elected to the see 29 January, the royal assent was given 20 March, he was consecrated at Lambeth 24 March, and received the temporalities 10 July. He received the degree of D.D. per gratiam in 1563. His dean at Wells was William Turner, another Marian exile but less conformist and with the dissenters in the Vestments controversy; Berkeley admonished him, and then in 1565 complained of his conduct to Archbishop Matthew Parker.

John Strype gives him a high reputation but records that in 1564 he licensed Thomas, son of John Harington, to the living of Kelston when only eighteen years of age. In 1574 the burgesses of Wells applied for a renewal of their ancient corporation, but Berkeley resisted their claim. In 1578 he successfully resisted an attempt made by William Paulet, 3rd Marquess of Winchester to impropriate the tithes of the living of West Monkton, of which he was patron. He died 2 November 1581. He had written to the lord treasurer urging that appointments might be made to fill sees, but the diocese of Bath and Wells was left without a bishop for nearly three years.

== Notes ==
Church of England titles
Preceded by Gilbert Bourne	Bishop of Bath and Wells; 1560–1581	Succeeded by Thomas Godwin
