= John Clerk (bishop) =

Bishop of Bath and Wells from 1523 to 1541

- Bishop of Bath and Wells
- Church: Roman Catholic Church
- Province: Canterbury
- Diocese: Bath and Wells
- Predecessor: Thomas Wolsey
- Successor: William Knight
- Previous post: Dean of Windsor

Personal details
- Born: Unknown England
- Died: 3 January 1541
- Buried: St Botolph's Church, Aldgate
- Denomination: Catholic

John Clerk (died 3 January 1541) was an English bishop. He was educated at Cambridge University, and went on to serve under Cardinal Wolsey in a variety of capacities. He was also useful in a diplomatic capacity to both Wolsey and Henry VIII of England.

== Life ==
He was Dean of Windsor from 1519 to 1523, then Bishop of Bath and Wells until his death. When the question of King Henry VIII's annulment of his marriage to his first wife, Catherine of Aragon, was raised Clerk was appointed as one of the Queen's counsellors. Wolsey persuaded him to agree on her behalf that she should withdraw from the proceedings at Rome. Afterwards he joined in pronouncing the annulment, and is believed to have assisted Thomas Cranmer in work on the Act of Supremacy.

His last embassy was in 1540, to the Duke of Cleves, to explain Henry's annulment of his marriage to Anne of Cleves. On his return he was taken ill at Dunkirk, possibly having been poisoned, but he managed to reach England, though only to die a short time later. He lies buried at St. Botolph's, Aldgate, not at Dunkirk, as sometimes stated.

Church of England titles
| Preceded by Thomas Wolsey | Bishop of Bath and Wells; 1523–1541 | Succeeded by William Knight |
