= The Death of King Edgar =

Old English poem

"The Death of King Edgar" is an Old English poem commemorating the death of the English King Edgar, nicknamed "the Peaceful". The poem, a "song of mourning", is found in two of the manuscripts of the Anglo-Saxon Chronicle.

== Sources ==
Two of the manuscripts of the Anglo-Saxon Chronicle contain the poem, in the annal for the year 975: the [D] manuscript (also known as "The Worcester Chronicle") and the [E] manuscript, also known as the "Peterborough Chronicle".

== Content and style ==
The 37-line poem reads like a series of disasters that will befall the English people after the death of the king. According to Lois Bragg, it is divisible into six sections, the last four of which share the theme of disaster:

1. ll. 1–2, the death of King Edgar
2. ll. 13–15, the death of bishop Cyneweard of Glastonbury
3. ll. 16–23, the "breaking up of the monasteries"
4. ll. 24–28, the expulsion of an invader named Olsac
5. ll. 29–33a, a comet appears
6. ll. 33b–37, a famine.

While the eighteenth-century historian Samuel Henry already noticed the poem, it is not generally praised for its beauty, and one nineteenth-century critic commented that "it exhibits the muse in the homeliest garb; nor does it contain sufficient of nature or feeling to redeem its rugged barbarity." For historians, the poem evidences an ongoing interest in historical writing in this period.

== Editions ==
- "The Second Death of Edgar" (975) is edited by Alex Ukropen and Martin Foys, with annotations and links to digital images of its manuscript pages, with translation, in the Old English Poetry in Facsimile Project: https://oepoetryfacsimile.org/?document=4895&document=4918
