= Humphrey I de Bohun =

Anglo-Norman nobleman

Map of Normandy showing location of the manor of Bohun (now Bohon), origin of the English de Bohun family

Humphrey I de Bohun (died c.1123), of Trowbridge Castle in Wiltshire, jure uxoris (Note: Trowbridge was held after the Conquest by Brictric and Edward of Salisbury, but Sanders considers Maud, Humphrey's wife, to be the first to hold the title of baron.) feudal baron of Trowbridge, was an Anglo-Norman nobleman who by his lucrative marriage became "the founder of the fortunes of his family", later prominent in England as Earls of Hereford and Earls of Essex. He is usually enumerated "Humphrey I" even though following his father he was the second "Humphrey de Bohun" settled in England. He has even been called "Humphrey the Great".

== Origins ==
Humphrey was the youngest son of Humphrey de Bohun ("With the Beard"), who had taken part in the Norman Conquest of England of 1066, lord of the manor of Bohun (now Bohon) in Manche, Normandy (in the 12th century split into two separate parishes of Saint-Georges-de-Bohon and Saint-André-de-Bohon), 26 kilometres (16 miles) north-east of Coutances and 18 kilometres (11 miles) north-west of Saint-Lô.

== Marriage and children ==
Humphrey married Maud of Salisbury, a daughter of Edward of Salisbury (died 1130), feudal baron of Trowbridge and of Chitterne, both in Wiltshire. Maud brought as her dowry the feudal barony of Trowbridge, whilst Chitterne was inherited by her brother Walter of Salisbury (died 1147). Humphrey and Maud had the following children:

- Humphrey II de Bohun (died 1165), eldest son and heir, feudal baron of Trowbridge. Together with his mother he founded the Cluniac Monkton Farleigh Priory in Wiltshire, to fulfill his father's wishes.
- Margaret de Bohun, wife of Walter Fitz Robert, who died childless.
- Ellen de Bohun, wife of Henry de Grey.

== See also ==
- Bohun family

== Sources ==
- White, Graeme, "Bohun, Humphrey (III) de (b. before 1144, d. 1181)," Oxford Dictionary of National Biography, Oxford University Press, 2004, accessed 20 December 2009.
