= Æthelwine of Wells =

11th-century Bishop of Wells

Æthelwine
- Bishop of Wells
- Elected: 1013
- In office: 1013–c. 1023 & unknown
- Predecessor: Lyfing; Brihtwine
- Successor: Brihtwine (twice)

Orders
- Consecration: 1013

Personal details
- Died: c. 1027
- Denomination: Christian

Æthelwine (or Ethelwine or Aethelwine) was an Anglo-Saxon Bishop of Wells. He was consecrated in 1013, and was expelled to make way for Brihtwine, but was restored and then once more expelled. He died possibly around 1027.

== Citations ==
Christian titles
Preceded by Lyfing	Bishop of Wells c. 1013–c. 1022	Succeeded by Brihtwine
Preceded by Brihtwine	Bishop of Wells unknown	Succeeded by Brihtwine
