= Walter Giffard =

Archbishop of York from 1266 to 1279

- Archbishop of York
- Elected: translated 15 October 1266
- Appointed: 15 October 1266
- Installed: 1 November 1266
- Term ended: late April 1279
- Predecessor: Godfrey Ludham
- Successor: William de Wickwane
- Other posts: Bishop of Bath and Wells

Orders
- Consecration: 4 January 1265 by Peter d'Acquablanca

Personal details
- Born: c. 1225
- Died: April 1279 York
- Buried: York Minster
- Parents: Hugh Giffard; Sibyl de Cormeilles

Lord Chancellor
- In office 1265–1266
- Monarch: Henry III of England
- Preceded by: Ralph Sandwich
- Succeeded by: Godfrey Giffard

Walter Giffard (c. 1225 – April 1279) was Lord Chancellor of England and Archbishop of York.

== Family ==
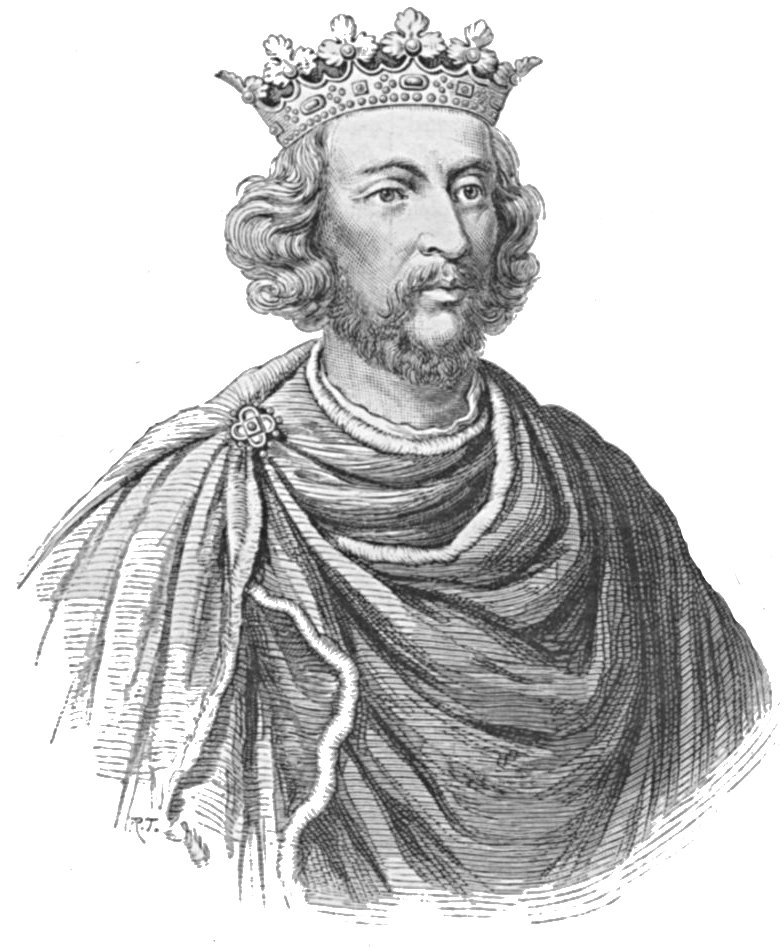
A picture of Henry III taken from Cassell's History of England published c. 1902. Henry entrusted his son Edward to the care of Walter's parents.

Giffard was a son of Hugh Giffard of Boyton in Wiltshire, a royal justice, by Sibyl, a daughter and co-heiress of Walter de Cormeilles. He was born about 1225, and may have been the oldest son. Hugh and Sybil were entrusted with the care of the young Prince Edward in 1239. In 1256 Giffard and his mother received the king's licence to live in Boyton Castle. Giffard's brother was Bishop Godfrey Giffard, who was Bishop of Worcester and also Lord Chancellor of England; his sister Mabel was the Abbess of Shaftesbury Abbey. Walter was also a kinsman of William of Bitton I, who was Walter's Bath & Wells predecessor. The family was also related to Walter de Gray, who was Archbishop of York from 1215 to 1255.

== Career ==
Giffard studied at Cambridge University and took his Master of Arts at Oxford University. While at university Adam Marsh wrote to another scholar praising Giffard's scholarly skills. Giffard took holy orders and became a canon and archdeacon of Wells and a papal chaplain. On 22 May 1264 he was elected Bishop of Bath and Wells and received the temporalities on 1 September 1264. As the Archbishop of Canterbury, Boniface of Savoy was in France, Giffard travelled to Paris to be consecrated at Notre-Dame on 4 January 1265. The service was performed by Peter d'Acquablanca, the Bishop of Hereford, Giffard having first sworn that he would not take part against King Henry III. However, the barons were angered that he had ventured abroad against their will and ravaged nearly all his manors. Archbishop Boniface ordered him to excommunicate Simon de Montfort the Earl of Leicester and his party on Giffard's return to England. Following the Battle of Evesham, on 10 August 1265 King Henry made Giffard Chancellor and awarded him a stipend of five hundred marks a year. In August of the following year he was appointed one of the arbitrators for drawing up the Dictum of Kenilworth which provided the disinherited lords a means of recovering their estates.

On 15 October 1266 Giffard was appointed by Pope Clement IV to the Archbishopric of York. As part of this elevation he resigned the chancellorship and was enthroned on 1 November 1266, receiving his temporalities on Boxing Day. Soon after his enthronement he became involved in a dispute with Archbishop Boniface of Canterbury about the right to carry his cross erect in the southern province, and ended up making an appeal to Rome.

Although Giffard had family wealth and much money associated with his office, he could not keep clear of debt. In the years after his appointment he paid 1600 marks to Italian money-lenders, 550 marks to certain merchants of Paris, and in 1270 sent 200 marks to his agents at Rome to expedite his affairs, hoping, "...for the present to keep out of the whirlpool of usury." Despite his own financial problems he seems to have been kind to his relatives, paying for his nephew's education and giving his brother Godfrey the Archdeaconry of York. His register contains many gifts to the poor, and he helped support schoolmasters at Beverley. He also supported the scholarly careers of two of his successors at York, John le Romeyn and William Greenfield.

On 13 October 1269 Giffard officiated at the translation of Edward the Confessor's relics. When leaving England, Prince Edward (who was then heir to the throne) appointed him by will in 1270 as one of the tutors of his sons. He also assisted Edward in bringing John de Warenne the Earl of Surrey to justice for the murder of Alan la Zouche at Westminster. Upon the death of Henry III on 20 November 1272 the Great Seal was delivered to the Archbishop as first Lord of the Council in order for him, Roger Mortimer and Robert Burnell to be appointed to govern the Kingdom until the new king's return to the country.

== Death ==
Giffard died at York on or about 22 April 1279, and he was buried in York Minster, probably in the choir. Archbishop Thoresby later removed his body to a tomb which he had erected in the presbytery. Contemporary reports state that Giffard was a handsome, happy and genial man who was fond of luxury; as a result of this in later life he grew fat which affected both his health and his temper. He was noted at the time as being a man of high character who was able and industrious.

== Citations ==
Political offices
Preceded by Ralph Sandwich (Keeper of the Great Seal)	Lord Chancellor; 1265–1266	Succeeded by Godfrey Giffard
Catholic Church titles
Preceded by William of Bitton I	Bishop of Bath and Wells; 1264–1266	Succeeded by William of Bitton II
Preceded by Bonaventure	Archbishop of York; 1266–1279	Succeeded by William de Wickwane
