= Robert of Winchester =

Robert of Winchester (died 1180) was abbot of Glastonbury. Formerly prior of Winchester, he became abbot of Glastonbury in succession to Henry of Blois in 1173.

Robert accepted a position as canon of Wells Cathedral, in a manoeuvre that ended unsuccessfully. Two churches, at Pilton and South Brent, the patronage of which was disputed between Wells Cathedral and Glastonbury Abbey— then fell under the jurisdiction of Wells.

Robert died on 28 April 1178, and was buried in the south part of the chapter-house. He was author of De actibus Willelmi et Henrici episcoporum Wintoniæ, printed in Henry Wharton's Anglia Sacra, biographies of William Giffard and Henry of Blois.

== Notes ==
Attribution

This article incorporates text from a publication now in the public domain: Lee, Sidney, ed. (1896). "Robert (d.1178)". Dictionary of National Biography. Vol. 48. London: Smith, Elder & Co.
