= William of Bitton (nephew) =

13th-century Bishop of Bath and Wells

William of Bitton (II)
- Bishop of Bath and Wells
- Arms of Bitton Blazon Escutcheon: Ermine, a fess gules.
- Elected: 10 February 1267
- Term ended: 4 December 1274
- Predecessor: Walter Giffard
- Successor: Robert Burnell
- Other post: Archdeacon of Wells

Orders
- Consecration: after 17 April 1267

Personal details
- Died: 4 December 1274
- Buried: Wells Cathedral

William of Bitton (Note: Sometimes known as William of Bitton II or William Button) (died 1274) was a medieval Bishop of Bath and Wells.

== Life ==
William was a son of Sir Adam of Bitton in Gloucestershire and the brother of Thomas Bitton who was precentor, archdeacon of Wells and Dean of Wells and Bishop of Exeter. His uncle was William of Bitton I, Bishop of Bath and Wells. He was rector of Buckland from 1257 and rector of Congresbury in Somerset from 1252. Before 13 December 1262 he was a canon of Bath and Wells, and was archdeacon of Wells as well as rector of Middlezoy in Somerset by 20 April 1263.

William was elected as bishop on 10 February 1267 and consecrated after 17 April 1267. He was not active in political or governmental events, although he did go to a council in 1269 that objected to ecclesiastical taxation. He, like his uncle, mainly worked in his diocese, and regulated the liturgical life of his cathedral and endowed the cathedral with some property.

William died 4 December 1274 and was buried in Wells Cathedral. Some veneration was given to him after his death, but no formal canonization ever occurred. He should not be confused with his uncle the first William of Bitton who was also Bishop of Bath and Wells, but who died in 1264.

== Citations ==
Catholic Church titles
| Preceded by Walter Giffard | Bishop of Bath and Wells; 1267–1274 | Succeeded by Robert Burnell |
