= Reginald Fitz Jocelin =

English bishop, Archbishop of Canterbury-elect (died in 1191)

Reginald fitz Jocelin
- Archbishop of Canterbury-elect
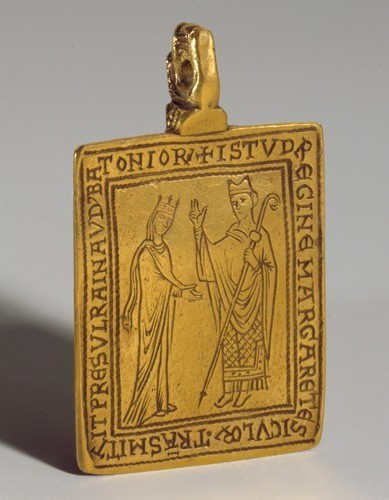
- Reliquary pendant depicting Reginald and Queen Margaret of Sicily from 1177
- Elected: 27 November 1191
- Term ended: 26 December 1191
- Predecessor: Baldwin of Forde
- Successor: Hubert Walter
- Other post: Bishop of Bath

Orders
- Consecration: 23 June 1174

Personal details
- Died: 26 December 1191 Dogmersfield, Hampshire
- Buried: Bath Abbey
- Parents: Josceline de Bohon

Reginald Fitz Jocelin (Note: Sometimes known as Reginald Italus, Richard the Lombard, or Reginald Lombardus.) (died 26 December 1191) was a medieval Bishop of Bath and an Archbishop of Canterbury-elect in England. A member of an Anglo-Norman noble family, he was the son of a bishop, and was educated in Italy. He was a household clerk for Thomas Becket, but by 1167 he was serving King Henry II of England. He was also a favourite of King Louis VII of France, who had him appointed abbot of the Abbey of Corbeil. After Reginald angered Becket while attempting to help negotiate a settlement between Becket and the king, Becket called him "that offspring of fornication, that enemy to the peace of the Church, that traitor." When he was elected as a bishop, the election was challenged by King Henry's eldest son, Henry the Young King, and Reginald was forced to go to Rome to be confirmed by Pope Alexander III. He attended the Third Lateran Council in 1179, and spent much of his time administering his diocese. He was elected Archbishop of Canterbury in 1191, but died before he could be installed.

== Early life ==
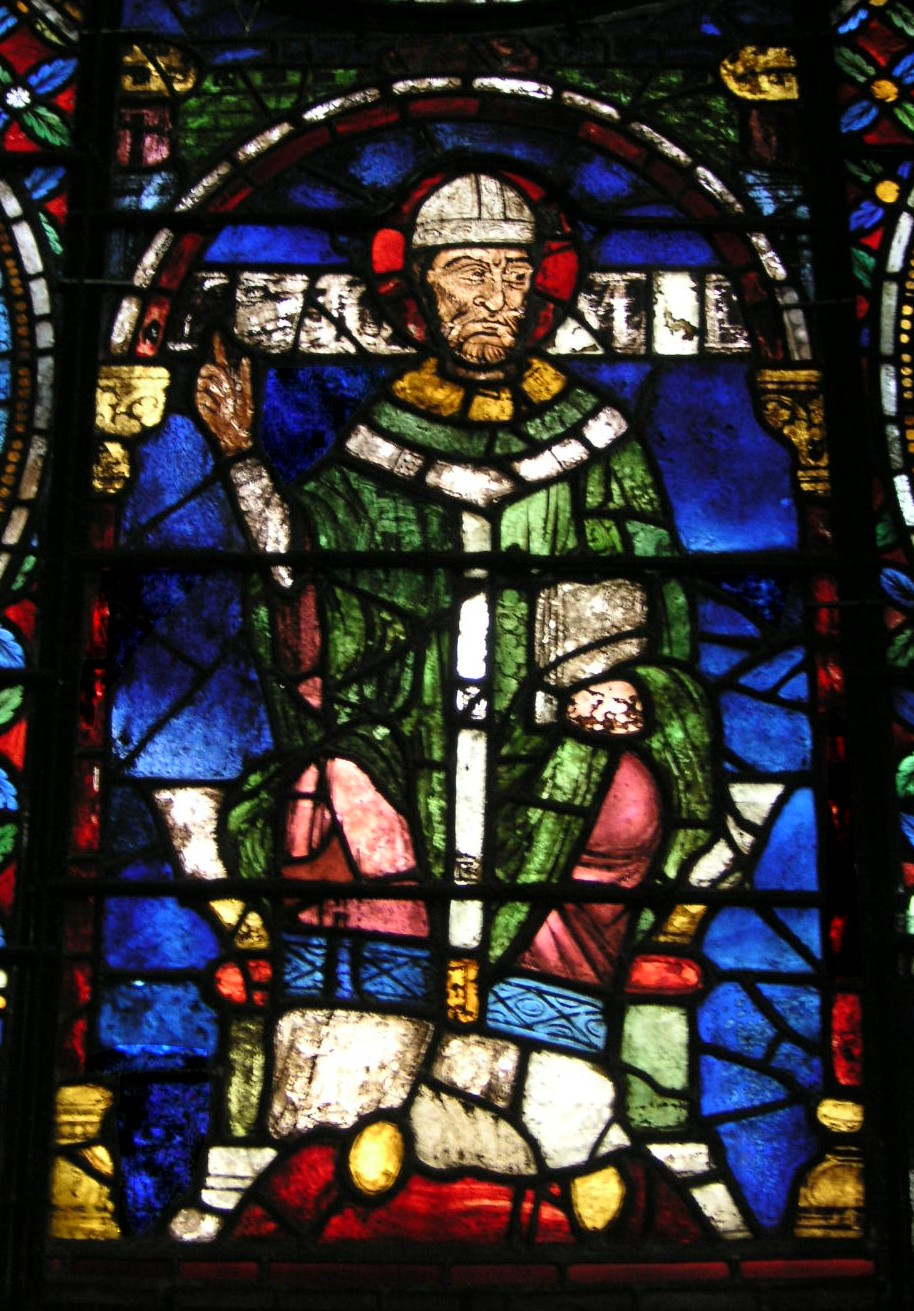
Stained glass window from Canterbury Cathedral depicting Thomas Becket, who Reginald served briefly.

Reginald was the son of Josceline de Bohon, the Bishop of Salisbury, although he was possibly born before his father became a priest. Reginald was a great-great-grandson of Humphrey de Bohun, one of the companions of William the Conqueror. Some sources say that he was born while his father was studying law in Italy. His uncle Richard de Bohon was Bishop of Coutances from 1151 to 1180. He was also related to Robert, Earl of Gloucester. Savaric FitzGeldewin, Reginald's successor at Bath, was Reginald's father's second cousin. Reginald's mother may have been a member of the family of the counts of Maurienne. He was born and brought up in Italy, which led to him sometimes being referred to as Reginald Italus, Reginald Lombardus or Reginald the Lombard. He was appointed Archdeacon of Wiltshire by his father before 8 December 1161, when he first signed a document as archdeacon. He served in Thomas Becket's household after Becket became archbishop, and by June 1164 was serving Becket's interests in France at both the court of the French King Louis VII and the papal Curia. It was probably in November 1164 that Louis named Reginald abbot of the Abbey of Corbeil.

Reginald probably studied at Paris sometime during 1163 or 1164, as he had a letter of introduction from Pope Alexander III to Hugues de Champfleury, Bishop of Soissons, the chancellor of Louis VII. Reginald did not complete his studies for the title of master, however, as he was in service with the King of England by 1167. He served King Henry II as a royal messenger to Rome during the crisis with Becket in 1167. (Note: Other members of this delegation were Clarembald, Simon de Prisun, and Henry of Northampton.) For the next four years, Reginald would be embroiled in the dispute and with trying to find a diplomatic solution to it. While serving Henry, Reginald incurred Becket's displeasure enough that Becket called Reginald "that offspring of fornication, that enemy to the peace of the Church, that traitor." However, John of Salisbury always maintained friendly relations with both Reginald and his father, even though John was a partisan of Becket's.

Reginald took part in the negotiations in August and September 1169 that attempted to reach a settlement between Henry and Becket. These negotiations included papal nuncios and most of the Norman bishops and prominent abbots, as well as the royal clerks. However, the negotiations came to nothing, and led to Becket's castigation of Reginald. Reginald was one of the main clerics working for King Henry during the dispute with Becket, along with John of Oxford, Richard of Ilchester, and Geoffrey Ridel. Henry's plans to reward the four with bishoprics in late 1170 probably precipitated the final crisis that led to Becket's murder.

== Bishop of Bath ==
Reginald was elected Bishop of Bath in late April 1173 and was consecrated 23 June 1174. However, Henry the Young King challenged the election, on the grounds of illegitimacy and an uncanonical election. Reginald went to Rome in the company of Richard of Dover, who had just been elected Archbishop of Canterbury and was facing a challenge from the Young King to his election. Reginald was confirmed by Pope Alexander III on 18 April 1174 with Walter Map alleging bribery as the only reason the election was confirmed. Ralph de Diceto, however, states that Reginald swore an oath that he was uninvolved in the death of Becket and that his birth took place before his father became a priest. During the dispute, Reginald's friend Peter of Blois wrote him a letter, which is still extant, (Note: Letter ep.30 in Migne's edition of Peter's letters.) encouraging him to persevere.

As a bishop, Reginald was kept busy attending the king's councils and the royal court, but also took part in the 1178 mission to Toulouse, led by Cardinal Pierre of San Crisogono, which attempted to deal with the Cathar heretics there. He attended the Third Lateran Council in 1179. During the 1180s, he was more active in the affairs of his diocese, and appears less often in the secular affairs of the kingdom, but in 1189 he took part in the coronation of King Richard I of England. In April 1191 he was one of the persons selected to arbitrate between the chancellor William Longchamp and Prince John of England. He also attended the trial of William Longchamp on 5 October 1191 at Loddon Bridge between Reading and Windsor that dismissed Longchamp from his offices. He may have been an unsuccessful candidate for the chancellorship of England. He was active as a bishop: some 122 acta from his time as bishop survive. He built the hospital of St. John in Bath, as well as building extensively at Wells Cathedral and starting the construction of the Bishop's Palace. He also issued a confirmation of the status of the town of Wells.

== Archbishop of Canterbury ==
Baldwin of Forde, the archbishop of Canterbury, died in 1190, while on Crusade in Palestine. Early in 1191, King Richard wrote to the cathedral chapter of Canterbury, which was composed of monks, not regular clergy, to recommend the election of William, who was Archbishop of Monreale, but this idea was not acted upon by the monks. In the autumn, William Longchamp, the chancellor, was driven from the kingdom by Walter de Coutances, who had been sent by the king to deal with the issue of Longchamp's misgovernment, and Prince John. Walter then turned to the issue of the vacant see of Canterbury, and ordered an election to take place on 2 December, and several bishops as well as Prince John and Walter arrived early at Canterbury. But Reginald was elected to the Archbishopric of Canterbury on 27 November 1191, by the monks. His election was an attempt by the monks to prevent a candidate unacceptable to them being forced on them, and his election was contested by Walter, who appealed to the papacy, and the monks counterappealed. Reginald's death on 26 December 1191 stopped the controversy and appeals. Reginald was probably chosen by the monks because he had supported the monks of Canterbury against their archbishop Baldwin of Forde in their dispute over the foundation of a church dedicated to Saint Thomas Becket. He died at Dogmersfield, Hampshire, and was buried at Bath. Before his death, he was admitted as a confrater of Christ Church Priory, Canterbury, and was buried in the habit of a Benedictine monk. According to a monk of Eynsham Abbey, after Reginald's death "he performed miraculous cures for certain weak and sick people." The same source claimed Reginald wore a hair shirt under his episcopal vestments.

== Citations ==
Catholic Church titles
Preceded by Robert	Bishop of Bath; 1173–1191	Succeeded by Savaric FitzGeldewin
Preceded by Baldwin of Forde	Archbishop of Canterbury; 1191–1191	Succeeded by Hubert Walter in 1193
