= Clarembald (abbot) =

12th-century abbot-elect of St Augustine's Abbey in England

- Abbot of St Augustine's
- Church: St Augustine's Abbey
- Appointed: 1163
- Term ended: 1173
- Predecessor: Silvester
- Successor: Roger

Personal details
- Died: 18 March

Clarembald was a medieval Benedictine monk and abbot-elect of St Augustine's Abbey in Canterbury, Kent.

Clarembald was a native of Normandy before he became prior of the Cluniac house Montacute Priory in 1155. Around 1158 he became prior of Thetford Priory, which he held until 1163.

Clarembald was appointed to St Augustine's in 1163, at the command of King Henry II of England. After his appointment, he refused to make a profession of obedience to Thomas Becket, the Archbishop of Canterbury, claiming that the abbey was exempt from oversight by the archbishop and that swearing obedience would compromise the abbey's independence. Pope Alexander III ordered Clarembald to swear to obey Becket on 10 July 1165, but offered two small concessions – one that the form should be in the same form that previous abbots had sworn and secondly that the oath would not preclude further legal actions on whether the profession was required. Clarembald, who was supported in his defiance of the archbishop by the king, continued to refuse to swear to obey Becket and was never consecrated as abbot. He remained as abbot-elect for his entire time in office.

In late 1167 Clarembald was a member of a royal deputation to the papacy, along with Reginald fitzJocelin, Simon de Prisun, and Henry of Northampton. The envoys were part of diplomatic efforts on behalf of the king as part of the Becket controversy between the king and Becket.

In 1168 the monks of St Augustine's complained to the papacy that Clarembald was allowing infants and small children to become monks of their abbey. (Note: The monks actual complaint was, in the words of David Knowles, "that infants recently at nurse" had been "clothed with the habit".) The monks were given a papal ruling that stated no one should be allowed to become a monk younger than age 15. The next year Clarembald was the sole supporter of a royal effort to remove England from papal and archiepiscopal authority. Clarembald was appointed to conduct the sheriff's inquest of 1170 in Kent and other southern counties.

On 29 December 1170, Clarembald was host to the four knights, Reginald fitzUrse, Hugh de Morville, William de Tracy, and Richard le Breton, who were on their way to confront Becket. The knights asked Clarembald's advice, and the abbot-elect sent a knight of the abbey, Simon de Criol, along with the other four to confront the archbishop, which led to the murder of the archbishop later that day.

The monks of St Augustine's had long complained that their abbot was incompetent, stole revenues meant for the monks, sold property belonging to the abbey for his own use, and accepted bribes. The dispute between Becket and the king appears to have delayed the papacy noticing the dire straits the abbey had fallen into, but after Becket's death in 1173 the situation finally resulted in papal action. Clarembald was deposed from his abbacy in 1173, by a papal commission composed of Bartholomew Iscanus the Bishop of Exeter, Roger the Bishop of Worcester, and the abbot of Faversham. (Note: The abbot of Faversham was also named Clarembald.) The judgement of deposition was seen by the judges as not just a punishment for Clarembald's offences against his monks, but also as a punishment for his involvement in the murder of Becket. (Note: The judges granted absolution to those monks who were forced by Clarembald to be involved in events around Becket's murder.) Clarembald had fled the abbey before the commission arrived, and his later career is unknown. Clarembald probably died on 18 March, when his obituary was remembered at St. Augustine's, but the year is not known.

The historian David Knowles called Clarembald a "worthless monk from overseas". Clarembald's contemporary, John of Salisbury, called him "God's rejected".
