= Brihtwine =

11th-century Bishop of Wells

- Bishop of Wells
- Church: Catholic
- In office: before 1024
- Predecessor: Æthelwine (twice)
- Successor: Æthelwine; Merewith

Personal details
- Died: c. 1024

Brihtwine (or Beorhtwine) was an Anglo-Saxon Bishop of Wells. His consecration date is not known, but he was expelled to restore his predecessor Æthelwine, but was restored and died sometime around 1024.

== Citations ==
Christian titles
Preceded by Æthelwine	Bishop of Wells c. 1023–?	Succeeded by Æthelwine
Preceded by Æthelwine	Bishop of Wells ?–before 1024	Succeeded by Merewith
