= Roger of Salisbury (bishop of Bath and Wells) =

13th-century Bishop of Bath and Wells

- Bishop of Bath and Wells (previously Bath)
- Elected: c. 3 February 1244
- Term ended: 21 December 1247
- Predecessor: Jocelin of Wells
- Successor: William of Bitton I
- Other post: precentor of Salisbury

Orders
- Consecration: 11 September 1244

Personal details
- Died: 21 December 1247
- Buried: Bath

Roger of Salisbury (died 1247) was a Bishop of Bath and Wells (previously Bath).

== Life ==
Roger was a canon of Salisbury by 3 July 1223 and was a theology lecturer at Salisbury by 30 September 1225. In late 1226 or early 1227 he acquired the prebend of Netheravon in the diocese of Salisbury. In 1223 he had the prebend of Teinton Regis in the diocese of Salisbury, and held that prebend until he became bishop. He was named to the office of precentor of Salisbury in early 1227.

Roger was elected about 3 February 1244 and consecrated 11 September 1244. His election was contentious because the canons of Wells, who had been promised the ability to participate in the election of the new bishop, were instead excluded. Eventually, William of Bitton I, who eventually succeeded Roger as bishop, managed to arrange a compromise. Roger died on 21 December 1247 and was buried at Bath. He should not be confused with Roger of Salisbury, Bishop of Salisbury, who died in 1139.

== Citations ==
Catholic Church titles
Preceded by Jocelin of Wells	Bishop of Bath; 1244–1245	Change of title
New title	Bishop of Bath and Wells; 1245–1247	Succeeded by William of Bitton I
