= Saint-André-de-Bohon =

- Commune
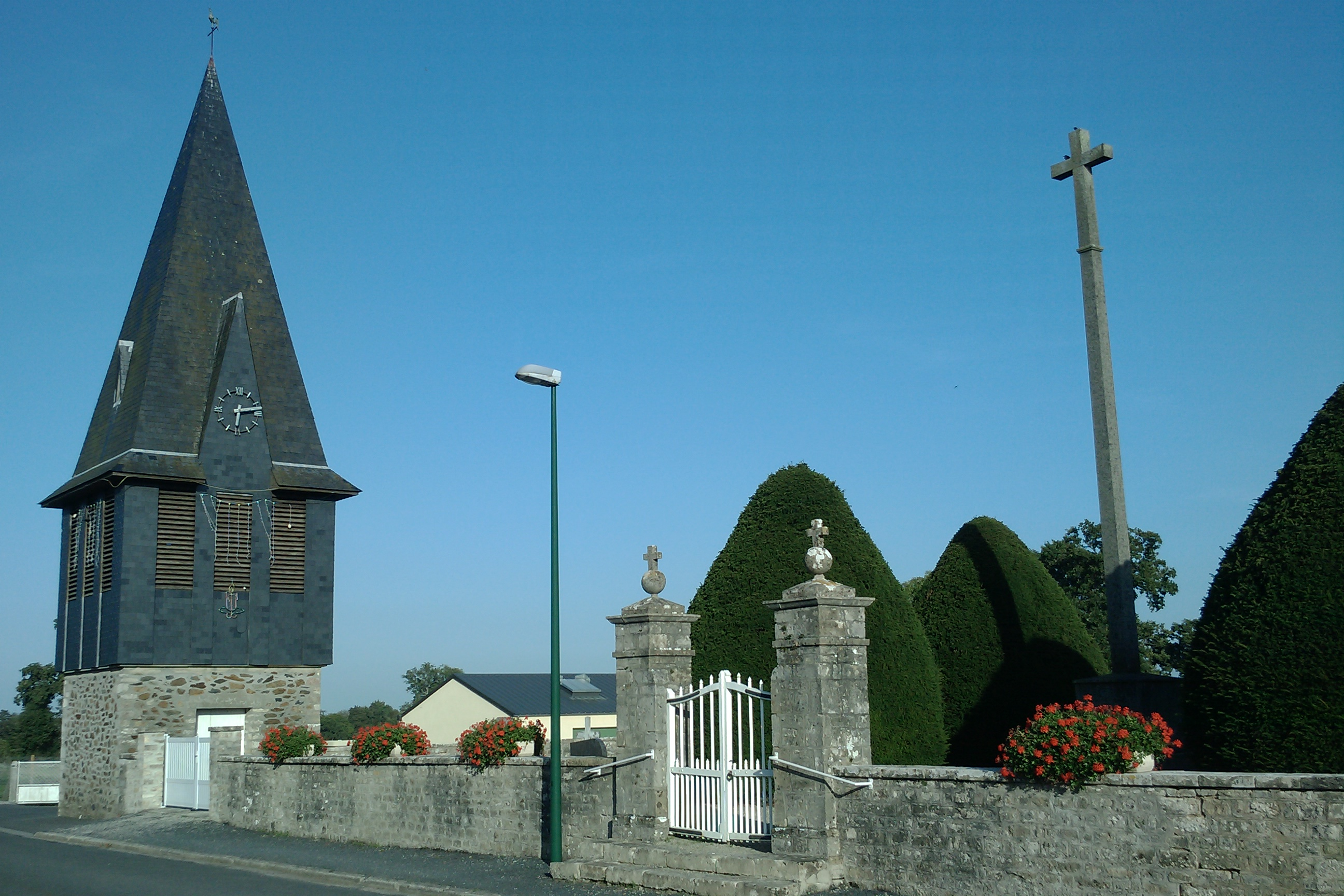
- The detached church bell tower
- Location of Saint-André-de-Bohon
- Location within France Location within Normandy
- Coordinates: 49°14′07″N 1°15′03″W
- Country: France
- Region: Normandy
- Department: Manche
- Arrondissement: Saint-Lô
- Canton: Carentan-les-Marais

Government
  - Mayor (2020–2026): Hugues Autard de Bragard
- Area^{1}: 10.43 km^{2} (4.03 sq mi)
- Elevation: 21 m (69 ft)
- Highest elevation: 21 m (69 ft)
- Lowest elevation: 0 m (0 ft)
- Population (2023): 375
  - Density: 36.0/km^{2} (93.1/sq mi)
- Time zone: UTC+01:00 (CET)
  - Summer (DST): UTC+02:00 (CEST)
- INSEE/Postal code: 50445 /50500
- ^{1} French Land Register data, which excludes lakes, ponds, glaciers > 1 km^{2} (0.386 sq mi or 247 acres) and river estuaries.

Saint-André-de-Bohon (French pronunciation: [sɛ̃.t‿ɑ̃dʁe də bɔ.ɔ̃]) is a commune in the Manche department in Normandy in north-western France.

== See also ==
- Communes of the Manche department
