= Jocelin of Wells =

13th-century Bishop of Bath and Glastonbury

- Bishop of Bath (previously of Bath and Glastonbury)
- Elected: 3 February 1206
- Predecessor: Savaric FitzGeldewin
- Successor: Roger of Salisbury
- Other post: canon of Wells

Orders
- Consecration: 26 May 1206 by William of Sainte-Mère-Eglise

Personal details
- Died: 12 November 1242 Wells
- Buried: Wells Cathedral

Jocelin of Wells (Note: Also known as Jocelinus Thoteman or Jocelin Troteman.) (died 19 November 1242) was a medieval Bishop of Bath (and Glastonbury). He was the brother of Hugh de Wells, who became Bishop of Lincoln. Jocelin became a canon of Wells Cathedral before 1200, and was elected bishop in 1206. During King John of England's dispute with Pope Innocent III, Jocelin at first remained with the king, but after the excommunication of John in late 1209, Jocelin went into exile. He returned to England in 1213 and was mentioned in Magna Carta in 1215.

Jocelin was one of the bishops who crowned John's son Henry III, and throughout the rest of Jocelin's life was involved in royal administration. He was also active in his diocese, ordering construction on the cathedral at Wells, and issuing rules for his diocesan clergy. During his time as bishop, he settled a dispute between his diocese and Glastonbury Abbey that had started during the bishopric of his predecessor. The memorial brass on his tomb in Wells Cathedral is probably one of the earliest in England.

== Early life ==
Jocelin born in Wells in Somerset, and was the son of Edward of Wells, a small landowner in the city of Wells. His brother Hugh de Wells was archdeacon of Wells and Bishop of Lincoln. Some historians say that another relative, although the exact relationship is unknown, was Simon of Wells, who became Bishop of Chichester in 1207, but other historians dispute this. The name Jocelin Trotman or Thotman, by which he was occasionally known by some modern historians, only dates from the Margam Annals, and is not contemporary with his life.

Jocelin was a royal justiciar in 1203, as well as the custodian of the vacant diocese of Lincoln. He was a royal clerk as well as a canon of Wells, becoming a canon and a deacon by 1200. The previous bishop of Wells died in 1205, and on 3 February 1206, Jocelin was elected bishop. He was consecrated on 28 May 1206, at Reading by Bishop William of Sainte-Mère-Eglise of London. It is unclear if the cathedral chapters of Bath and of Wells took the action on their own, or if King John was the driving force behind the election.

== Adviser to King John ==
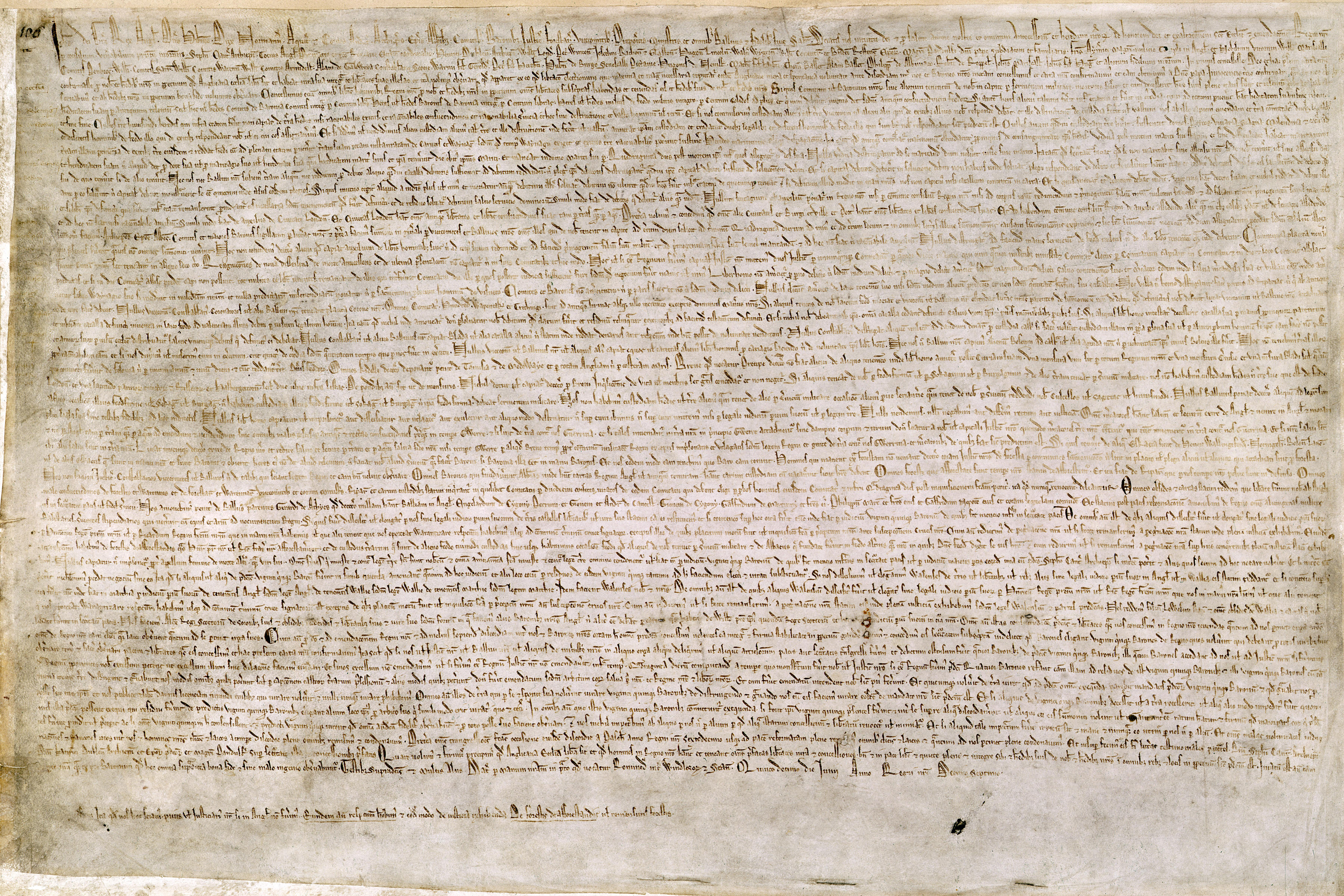
A copy of Magna Carta

Jocelin was one of the main advisers of King John during the dispute with the pope over Stephen Langton's appointment to the Archbishopric of Canterbury. Jocelin did not immediately leave England after Pope Innocent III placed an interdict on England. Jocelin encouraged John to settle with Innocent in early 1209, worried that Innocent would expand the interdict into an excommunication, forcing John's advisers to choose between serving the king or obeying the pope. Nothing came of the negotiations, however. Jocelin did leave England when John was excommunicated in late 1209. Jocelin, along with Gilbert Glanvill, the Bishop of Rochester, was the subject of a mocking song on his conduct during the interdict.

Jocelin and Hugh were in exile together in Bordeaux in 1212, but they both returned to England in May 1213, along with the other English bishops. Jocelin was one of the bishops in August 1214 who refused to pay a scutage to the king. In 1215, Jocelin sided with Stephen Langton and the barons, and Magna Carta lists Jocelin as one of the king's councillors.

== Henry III's reign ==
Jocelin and Peter des Roches, the Bishop of Winchester, anointed and crowned King Henry III, the young son of John, after John's death. Later, Jocelin was present at the battle with Eustace the Monk in 1217, which helped to secure Henry's rule. Jocelin supported Hubert de Burgh's work of ejecting French forces from England and regaining control of royal castles seized by Falkes de Breauté and other barons. In 1218, Jocelin was one of the itinerant justiciars for southwestern England.

In 1218 and 1219, Jocelin also ended the dispute between his diocese and Glastonbury Abbey. Jocelin gave up any claim to control of the abbey, and the abbey gave the bishopric a number of estates. Previously, the bishops, as part of their attempt to annexe Glastonbury to their bishopric, had been known as the Bishop of Bath and Glastonbury. They also had held the office of abbot. In 1218, as part of the settlement, a new abbot was elected at Glastonbury. The papacy had never acknowledged Jocelin's claiming of the title of abbot. The historian J. A. Robinson felt that as part of the settlement, Jocelin began to use the title Bishop of Bath and Wells, but another historian, David Knowles, disagreed.

After 1223, Jocelin was a baron of the exchequer. In 1225 he served the king as head of one of the receivers of the tax of a fifteenth. After the dismissal of Walter Mauclerk as treasurer, at first Jocelin, along with Richard Poore, the Bishop of Durham, took over many of the treasurer's functions, but this did not last long, and after 1233, Jocelin no longer was involved with financial affairs. He occasionally witnessed charters, however. After the fall of Peter des Roches in April 1234, Jocelin was given control of the Wardrobe. After this, he appears less regularly in royal government, but he did witness the reconfirmation of Magna Carta in 1237.

== Diocesan affairs ==
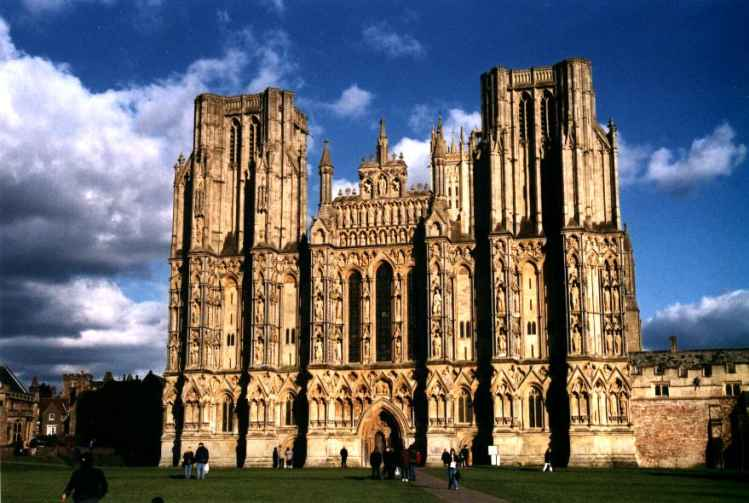
West front of Wells Cathedral, which was constructed under Jocelin

With his brother Hugh, Jocelin founded St. John's Hospital at Wells. Jocelin promulgated a set of constitutions for the diocese, ordered that his diocesan clergy reside in their benefices, and gave land and income to the cathedral school. Glastonbury Abbey complained of Jocelin that he plundered the lands of the abbey. Jocelin was also involved in mediating between William de Blois, the Bishop of Worcester, and Tewkesbury Abbey over William's rights over the abbey. Jocelin finally settled the dispute in 1232.

Jocelin funded the building of Wells Cathedral, begun at the east end in the Early English Gothic style under Reginald Fitz Jocelin. The nave was completed, the west front begun. The new cathedral was consecrated on 23 October 1239 by Jocelin. Other construction work undertaken by Jocelin included the cloisters and bishop's palace at Wells, and a manor house at Wookey.

== Death ==
Jocelin died on 19 November 1242 at Wells and was buried in the choir of Wells Cathedral. He may have been the father of Nicholas of Wells. The memorial brass on his tomb was allegedly one of the earliest brasses in England. He employed the medieval architect Elias of Dereham as a household official.

== Citations ==
Catholic Church titles
Preceded by Savaric FitzGeldewin	Bishop of Bath and Glastonbury; 1206–1219	Change of title
New title	Bishop of Bath; 1219–1242	Succeeded by Roger of Salisbury
