= Humphrey with the Beard =

Norman soldier and nobleman

Humphrey with the Beard (died before 1113) was a Norman soldier and nobleman, the earliest known ancestor of the de Bohun family, later prominent in England as Earls of Hereford and Earls of Essex.

Map showing location of the manor of Bohun (now Bohon) in Normandy, origin of the English de Bohun family

Humphrey's epithet, "with the beard" (cum barba), was a distinguishing one in eleventh-century Normandy, where the custom was to shave the face and back of the head. It is first recorded in a later chronicle of Llanthony Prima, edited by William Dugdale in the Monasticon Anglicanum (VI.134):

Dominus Humfredus de Bohun, cum barba, qui prius venit cum Willielmo Conquestore in Angliam de Normannia, cognatus dicti Conquestoris. . . ("Lord Humphrey de Bohun, with the beard, who first came with William the Conqueror to England from Normandy, a relative of the said Conqueror").

As is stated by Wace in the Roman de Rou, Humphrey derived from "Bohun" in Normandy: De Bohun le Vieil Onfrei ("from Bohun the old Humphrey"). Today this holding comprises two communes, Saint-André-de-Bohon and Saint-Georges-de-Bohon. He donated a plough and garden to the nuns of the Abbaye Saint-Amand at Rouen. The charter was witnessed by William, Duke of Normandy as Comes ("Count"), placing the gift before the 1066 Norman conquest of England. He later donated the church of Saint-Georges-de-Bohon to the Abbey of Marmoutier. After the conquest, he received lands in England, including his seat at the manor of Tatterford in Norfolk, as recorded in the Domesday Book of 1086.

Humphrey's donation to Abbaye Saint-Amand indicates he had been married three times, but the names of his wives are unknown. He had three sons and two daughters, including:

- Robert de Bohun, eldest son, who died unmarried and predeceased his father.
- Richard de Bohun, 2nd son, and progenitor in the female line of the Bohuns of Midhurst.
- Humphrey I de Bohun (died c.1123), youngest son, who by convention according to James Planché is given the first ordinal number because by his marriage he was "the founder of the fortunes of his family".

== Sources ==
- White, Graeme, "Bohun, Humphrey (III) de (b. before 1144, d. 1181)," Oxford Dictionary of National Biography, Oxford University Press, 2004, accessed 20 December 2009.
