= Savaric FitzGeldewin =

12th-century Bishop of Bath and Glastonbury

Savaric fitzGeldewin
- Bishop of Bath and Glastonbury (previously Bath)
- Elected: December 1191
- Term ended: 18 August 1205
- Predecessor: Reginald fitzJocelin
- Successor: Jocelin of Wells
- Other posts: Archdeacon of Northampton; Treasurer of Salisbury

Orders
- Ordination: 19 September 1192
- Consecration: 20 September 1192

Personal details
- Died: 18 August 1205 Italy
- Buried: Rome

Savaric fitzGeldewin (Note: Sometimes known as Savaric FitzGoldwin or Savaric de Bohun.) (died 8 August 1205) was an Englishman who became Bishop of Bath and Glastonbury in England. Related to his predecessor as well as to Emperor Henry VI, he was elected bishop on the insistence of his predecessor, who urged his election on the cathedral chapter of Bath. While bishop Savaric spent many years attempting to annexe Glastonbury Abbey as part of his bishopric. Savaric also worked to secure the release of King Richard I of England from captivity when the king was held by Emperor Henry VI.

== Early life ==
Savaric's date of birth is unknown. His father was Geldwin, who was a member of the Bohun family and was probably a second cousin of his predecessor as Bishop of Bath, Reginald fitzJocelin. Geldwin's father was Savaric Fitzcana, who held Midhurst in Sussex. The elder Savaric's wife was Muriel, who was a granddaughter of Humphrey de Bohun. The younger Savaric's mother Estrangia was a Burgundian and related to Henry VI, Holy Roman Emperor. (Note: How exactly she was related to Henry is unclear. The historian Austin Lane Poole theorized that she was a relative of Joscelin of Louvain, the brother of King Henry I of England's second wife, Adeliza. Another possibility, put forth by the historian Kathleen Thompson, is that she was the daughter of one of Adeliza's household members who came with her from Louvain on her marriage.) Savaric's elder brother was Franco, lord of Midhurst.

Savaric first appears in the historical record in 1157 when he is named as a canon of Coutances Cathedral in Normandy. He then was archdeacon of Countances from 1162 to 1174. He was Treasurer of Salisbury in 1174 and archdeacon of Northampton from 1175 to 1187. The medieval chronicler Ralph Diceto says that a Savaric was appointed as Archdeacon of Canterbury, but whether this was the same Savaric is unclear. He incurred large debts to King Henry II of England, which caused the king to complain to Pope Urban III. During the years 1182–1184, Savaric was deprived of his archdeaconries, which may have been connected to the debt issue with the king.

== Bishop ==
Savaric went with Henry's son and successor King Richard I on crusade, and it was while they both were in Sicily that Savaric obtained his bishopric. In December 1191, he was elected Bishop of Bath. Savaric's election was held under controversial conditions, for Savaric had obtained from Richard I letters allowing Savaric to be elected to the next available bishopric. When Savaric's cousin Reginald was elected to Canterbury in 1191, Reginald went to Bath and pressed the clergy there to select Savaric as Reginald's successor. On the strength of the letters from Richard, the justiciar Walter de Coutances ratified the election of Savaric. The canons of Wells objected because they had not been consulted, but Savaric was ordained a priest on 19 September 1192 at Rome. He was consecrated bishop there on 20 September 1192 by the Bishop of Albano. He went on the Third Crusade with Richard.

When Richard was held for ransom in Germany while returning from crusade, Savaric met with his cousin, the Emperor Henry VI, in an attempt to secure Richard's release. He remained in Germany throughout 1193 and continued to be involved in the negotiations until he returned to England at the end of the year. Once Richard was released, Savaric was one of the hostages left behind in Germany to ensure the payment of the remainder of the ransom. It may have been while he was in Germany negotiating about Richard's ransom that he was named imperial chancellor of Burgundy, but as he was not named by that title until 1197, the exact date of his occupation of the office is unclear.

== Controversy with Glastonbury ==
After his consecration, Savaric traded the city of Bath to the king in return for the monastery of Glastonbury. Savaric secured the support of Pope Celestine III for the takeover of the abbey as the seat of his bishopric, replacing Bath. The plan was that Savaric would be bishop of Bath as well as abbot of Glastonbury. In his support, Savaric obtained letters from various ecclesiastics, including the Archbishop of Canterbury, Hubert Walter, that claimed that this arrangement would settle longstanding disputes between the abbey and the bishops. The monks of Glastonbury objected to Savaric's plan and sent an appeal to Rome, which was dismissed in 1196. But King Richard, no longer imprisoned in Germany, sided with the monks and allowed them to elect an abbot, William Pica, in place of Savaric, who responded by excommunicating the new abbot. With the succession of John as king in place of his brother Richard in 1199, Savaric managed to force his way into the monastery and set up his episcopal see within the abbey. The monks appealed to Innocent III, the new pope.

At first, Innocent took the side of the monks, and lifted Pica's excommunication. While the newest appeal was taking place, Pica and a number of his supporters, who had traveled to Rome to appeal in person, died in Rome in 1200, and some of the monks alleged this was by poison administered on the orders of Savaric. Meanwhile, Innocent had changed his mind and reinstalled Savaric as abbot, ordering some English clergy to judge the specifics of the case and allot the revenues of the abbey between Savaric and the monks. Savaric then attempted to secure more control over other monasteries in his diocese, but died before he could set the plans in motion.

== Death and legacy ==
Savaric died at Civitavecchia or Siena on 8 August 1205 while visiting the papacy in Rome on business for Peter des Roches, Bishop-elect of Winchester. He was there to support Roches' election, which had been contested. Roches also supported Savaric in his struggles with Glastonbury, loaning the bishop money and being appointed to a papal commission to deal with Savaric's petitions, which went nowhere because Savaric died before the commission first met. He was buried at Bath.

== Citations ==
Catholic Church titles
Preceded by Reginald fitzJocelin	Bishop of Bath; 1191–1197	Change of title
New title	Bishop of Bath and Glastonbury; 1197–1205	Succeeded by Jocelin of Wells
