= Bishop of Bath and Wells =

Diocesan bishop in the Church of England

- Bishopric

anglican
- Arms of the Bishop of Bath and Wells: Azure, a saltire per saltire quarterly quartered or and argent
- Incumbent; Michael Beasley

Location
- Ecclesiastical province: Canterbury
- Residence: Bishop's Palace, Wells

Information
- First holder: Athelm
- Established: 909
- Diocese: Bath and Wells
- Cathedral: Wells Cathedral

Website
- www.bathandwells.org.uk

The bishop of Bath and Wells is the diocesan bishop of the diocese of Bath and Wells in the Church of England. The bishop's seat, or cathedra, is at the Cathedral Church of Saint Andrew in the city of Wells. The diocese covers most of Somerset and a small part of Dorset.

From 1090 until the Reformation the Abbey Church of St Peter and Paul in the city of Bath was also a cathedral of the diocese, and the double name has been retained. The bishop has the right, together with the bishop of Durham, to escort the sovereign at the coronation. The bishop's residence is the Bishop's Palace, Wells.

== History ==
Somerset originally came under the authority of the Bishop of Sherborne, but Wells became the seat of its own bishop of Wells from 909. King William Rufus granted Bath to a royal physician, John of Tours, Bishop of Wells and Abbot of Bath, who was permitted to move his episcopal seat for Somerset from Wells to Bath in 1090, thereby becoming the first bishop of Bath. He planned and began a much larger church as his cathedral, to which was attached a priory, with the bishop's palace beside it.

In 1197 Bishop Savaric FitzGeldewin officially moved his seat to Glastonbury Abbey with the approval of Pope Celestine III. However, the monks there would not accept their new bishop of Glastonbury and the title of bishop of Bath and Glastonbury was used until the Glastonbury claim was abandoned in 1219. His successor, Jocelin of Wells, then returned to Bath, again under the title, bishop of Bath. The official episcopal title became bishop of Bath and Wells under a Papal ruling of 3 January 1245.

By the 15th century Bath Abbey was badly dilapidated. Oliver King, bishop of Bath and Wells, decided in 1500 to rebuild it on a smaller scale. The new abbey-church was completed just a few years before Bath Priory was dissolved in 1539. Then Henry VIII considered this new church redundant, and it was offered to the people of Bath to form their parish church; but they did not buy it, and it was stripped of its glass and lead. The last bishop in communion with Rome was deprived in 1559 but the succession of bishops has continued to the present day.

In late 2013 the Church Commissioners announced that they were purchasing the Old Rectory, a Grade II-listed building in Croscombe for the bishop's residence. However this decision was widely opposed, including by the diocese, and in May 2014 was overturned by a committee of the Archbishops' Council.

The diocese and the episcopate are today part of the Anglican Communion.

== List of bishops ==
=== Pre-Reformation bishops ===
Bishops of Wells
From	Until	Incumbent	Notes
c. 909	c. 923–925	Athelm	Formerly a monk at Glastonbury Abbey. Consecrated circa 909. Translated to Canterbury between 923 and September 925.
c. 923–925	c. 926–928	Wulfhelm	Consecrated between circa 923 and 925. Translated to Canterbury between January 926 and 928.
c. 926–928	937 or 938	Alphege	Consecrated between January 926 and 928. Died in office. Also recorded as Ælfheah.
937 or 938	956	Wulfhelm II	Consecrated in 937 or 938. Died in office.
956	973	Byrhthelm	Formerly a monk at Glastonbury Abbey. Consecrated in 956. Translated to Canterbury in 959, but deposed and translated back to Wells in the same year. Died in office on 15 May 973.
973 or 974	975	Cyneweard	Formerly Abbot of Milton. Consecrated in 973 or 974. Died in office on 28 June 975.
c. 975–979	996	Sigar	Formerly Abbot of Glastonbury (c. 970–975). Consecrated between 975 and 979. Died in office on 28 June 996.
996	998 or 999	Ælfwine	Consecrated in 996 or 997. Died in office on 29 August in 998 or 999.
998 or 999	1013	Lyfing	Formerly Abbot of Chertsey Abbey. Consecrated in 998 or 999. Translated to Canterbury in 1013.
c. 1013–18	c. 1021–24	Aethelwine	Consecrated between 1013 and 1018. Expelled circa 1021/1023 and 1024 in favour of Brihtwine.
c. 1021–24	unknown	Brihtwine	Expelled.
unknown	unknown	Aethelwine (again)	Restored but expelled a second time.
unknown	before 1024	Brihtwine (again)	Restored. Died in office before 1024.
before 1024	1033	Merewith	Consecrated before 1024. Died in office on 11 or 12 April 1033.
1033	1060	Dudoc	Consecrated on 11 June 1033. Died in office on 18 January 1060.
1061	1088	Gisa	Previously chaplain to King Edward the Confessor. Elected bishop after 18 January 1060 and consecrated on 15 April 1061. Died in office in 1088. Also recorded as Giso.
1088	1090	John of Tours	Consecrated Bishop of Wells in July 1088. Became Bishop of Bath when he moved the see from Wells to Bath in 1090.
Bishops of Bath
From	Until	Incumbent	Notes
1090	1122	John of Tours	Moved the see from Wells to Bath in 1090. Died in office between 29 and 30 December 1122. Also recorded as John de Villula.
1123	1135	Godfrey	Formerly chaplain to Queen Consort Adeliza. Nominated on 25 March and consecrated on 26 August 1135. Died in office on 16 August 1135.
1136	1166	Robert	Previously a monk at Lewes Priory. Consecrated on 22 March and received possession of the temporalities circa 22 March 1136. Died in office on 31 August 1166.
1166	1174	See vacant	
1174	1191	Reginald fitz Jocelin	Previously Archdeacon of Wiltshire. Elected bishop in late April 1173 and consecrated on 23 June 1174. He became Archbishop-elect of Canterbury on 27 November 1191, but before appeals against his election were heard, he died on 26 December 1191.
1192	1197	Savaric FitzGeldewin	Formerly Archdeacon of Northampton (1175–1192). Elected bishop by the monks of Bath Abbey between 27 November and 26 December 1191 and consecrated on 20 September 1192. Also became Abbot of Glastonbury in 1193. He moved the Episcopal seat from Bath to Glastonbury in 1197.
Bishops of Bath and Glastonbury
From	Until	Incumbent	Notes
1197	1205	Savaric FitzGeldewin	After moving the Episcopal seat from Bath to Glastonbury in 1197, he was styled Bishop of Bath and Glastonbury. Died in office on 8 August 1205.
1206	1219	Jocelin of Wells	Previously Canon of Wells. Elected bishop on 3 February and consecrated on 28 May 1206. He was styled Bishop of Bath and Glastonbury until 1219, thereafter Bishop of Bath.
Bishops of Bath
From	Until	Incumbent	Notes
1219	1242	Jocelin of Wells	Previously styled Bishop of Bath and Glastonbury until 1219, thereafter Bishop of Bath. Died in office on 19 November 1242.
1242	1244	See vacant	
1244	1245	Roger of Salisbury	Formerly Precentor of Salisbury (1227–1244). Elected bishop by the monks of Bath Abbey on 6 February 1243 and consecrated on 11 September 1244. Became Bishop of Bath and Wells on 3 January 1245.
Bishops of Bath and Wells
From	Until	Incumbent	Notes
1245	1247	Roger of Salisbury	Following a papal ruling, the episcopal title changed to Bishop of Bath and Wells on 3 January 1245. Died in office on 21 December 1247.
1248	1264	William of Bitton I	Formerly Archdeacon of Wells (1238–1248). Elected bishop before 24 February and consecrated on 14 June 1248. Died in office on 3 April 1264.
1265	1266	Walter Giffard	Elected bishop on 22 May 1264 and consecrated on 4 January 1265. Also Lord Chancellor (1265–1266). Translated to York on 15 October 1266.
1267	1274	William of Bitton II	Formerly Archdeacon of Wells (c. 1263–1267). Elected bishop on 10 February and consecrated after 17 April 1267. Died in office on 4 December 1274.
1275	1292	Robert Burnell	Formerly Archdeacon of York (1270–1275). Elected bishop on 23 January and consecrated on 1275. Became Archbishop-elect of Canterbury (1278–1279) and Bishop-elect of Winchester (1280). Also Lord Chancellor (1274–1292). Died in office on 25 October 1292.
1293	1302	William of March	Formerly Dean of St. Martin's-le-Grand and Lord Treasurer. Elected bishop on 28 January and consecrated on 17 May 1293. Died in office before 19 June 1302.
1302	1308	Walter Haselshaw	Formerly Dean of Wells (1295–1302). Elected bishop on 7 August and consecrated on 4 November 1302. Died in office on 11 December 1308.
1309	1329	John Droxford	John Drokensford; formerly Keeper of the wardrobe and acting Lord Treasurer. Elected bishop on 5 February and consecrated on 9 November 1309. Died in office on 9 May 1329
1329	1363	Ralph of Shrewsbury	Elected on 2 June and consecrated on 3 September 1329. Died in office on 14 August 1363.
1363	1366	John Barnet	Translated from Worcester. Appointed on 24 December (or about 28 November) 1363 and received the temporalities on 6 April 1364. Translated to Ely on 15 December 1366.
1367	1386	John Harewell	Previously Chancellor of Gascony and chaplain to the Black Prince. Appointed bishop on 14 December 1366 and consecrated on 7 March 1367. Died in office between 29 June and 14 July 1386.
1386	1388	Walter Skirlaw	Translated from Coventry & Lichfield. Appointed on 18 August and received the temporalities on 3 November 1386. Translated to Durham on 3 April 1388.
1388	1400	Ralph Ergham	Translated from Salisbury. Appointed on 3 April and received the temporalities on 13 September 1388. Died in office on 10 April 1400.
1400	1401	(Richard Clifford)	Appointed on 12 May 1400, but, before consecration, translated to Worcester on 19 August 1401.
1401	1407	Henry Bowet	Formerly Canon of Wells. Appointed bishop on 19 August 1401 and consecrated on 20 November 1401. Translated to York on 7 October 1407.
1407	1424	Nicholas Bubwith	Translated from Salisbury. Appointed on 7 October and received the temporalities on 2 December 1407. Died in office on 27 October 1424.
1424	1443	John Stafford	Formerly Dean of Wells (1423–1424). Elected bishop between 14 November and 19 December 1424. Consecrated on 27 May 1425. Also Lord Treasurer (1422–1426) and Lord Chancellor (1432–1450). Translated to Canterbury on 13 May 1443.
1443	1465	Thomas Beckington	Formerly Archdeacon of Buckingham (1424–1443). Appointed bishop on 24 July and consecrated on 13 October 1443. Also the Keeper of the Privy Seal (1443–1444). Died in office on 14 January 1465.
1465	1491	Robert Stillington	Formerly Archdeacon of Taunton (1450–1465). Appointed bishop on 30 October 1465 and consecrated on 16 March 1466. Also intermittently Lord Chancellor between 1460 and 1473. Died in office before 15 May 1491.
1492	1494	Richard Foxe	Translated from Exeter. Appointed on 8 February and received the temporalities on 4 May 1492. Translated to Durham on 30 July 1494.
1495	1503	Oliver King	Translated from Exeter. Appointed on 6 November 1495 and received the temporalities on 6 January 1496. Died in office on 29 August 1503.
1504	1518	Cardinal Adriano Castellesi	Translated from Hereford. Appointed on 2 August and received possession of the temporalities on 13 October 1504. Deprived of the see by Pope Leo X on 5 July 1518.
1518	1523	Cardinal Thomas Wolsey	Archbishop of York (1514–1530) and Lord Chancellor (1515–1529). Appointed in commendam the see of Bath and Wells on 27 July 1518, but exchanged it to the see of Durham on 26 March 1523.

=== Bishops during the Reformation ===
Bishops of Bath and Wells during the Reformation
From	Until	Incumbent	Notes
1523	1541	John Clerk	Formerly Master of the Rolls (1522–1523) and Dean of Windsor (1519–1523). Appointed bishop on 26 March and consecrated on 6 December 1523. Accepted royal supremacy in 1534. Died in office on 31 January 1541.
1541	1547	William Knight	Formerly Secretary of State to Henry VIII (1526–1528) and Prebendary of St Paul's (1517–1541). Nominated bishop on 9 April and consecrated on 29 May 1541. Died in office on 29 September 1547.
1548	1553	William Barlow	Translated from St David's. Nominated on 3 February 1548. Resigned before 4 October 1553. Later became Bishop of Chichester in 1559.
1554	1559	Gilbert Bourne	Formerly Prebendary of St Paul's and Lord President of Wales and the Marches. Nominated bishop on 13 March and consecrated on 1 April 1554. Deprived between 18 October 1559 and 11 January 1560. Died on 10 September 1569.

=== Post-Reformation bishops ===
Post-Reformation Bishops of Bath and Wells
From	Until	Incumbent	Notes
1560	1581	Gilbert Berkeley	Nominated on 11 January and consecrated on 24 March 1560. Died in office on 2 November 1581.
1581	1584	See vacant	
1584	1590	Thomas Godwin	Formerly Dean of Canterbury (1567–1584). Nominated bishop on 25 July and consecrated on 13 September 1584. Died in office on 19 November 1590.
1590	1592	See vacant	
1593	1608	John Still	Formerly Master of Trinity College, Cambridge (1577–1593). Nominated bishop on 13 January and consecrated on 11 February 1593. Died in office on 26 February 1608.
1608	1616	James Montague	Formerly Dean of Worcester (1604–1608). Nominated bishop on 21 March and consecrated on 17 April 1608. Translated to Winchester on 4 October 1616.
1616	1626	Arthur Lake	Formerly Dean of Worcester (1608–1616). Elected on 17 October and consecrated on 8 December 1616. Died in office on 4 May 1626.
1626	1628	William Laud	Translated from St David's. Nominated bishop of Bath & Wells on 20 June and confirmed on 18 September 1626. Translated to London on 15 July 1628.
1628	1629	Leonard Mawe	Nominated on 14 July and consecrated on 7 September 1628. Also Master of Trinity College, Cambridge (1625–1628). Died in office on 2 September 1629
1629	1632	Walter Curle	Translated from Rochester. Elected on 29 October and confirmed on 4 December 1629. Translated to Winchester on 16 November 1632.
1632	1646	William Piers	Translated from Peterborough. Nominated on 19 November and confirmed on 13 December 1632. Deprived of the see when the English episcopy was abolished by Parliament on 9 October 1646.
1646	1660	The see was abolished during the Commonwealth and the Protectorate.	
1660	1670	William Piers (restored)	Returned when the see was restored in 1660. Died in office on 30 April 1670.
1670	1672	Robert Creighton	Formerly Dean of Wells (1660–1670). Nominated on 2 May and consecrated on 19 June 1670. Died in office on 20 November 1672.
1673	1684	Peter Mews	Formerly Dean of Rochester (1670–1673). Nominated on 23 November 1672 and consecrated 6 February 1673. Translated to Winchester on 22 November 1684.
1685	1690	Thomas Ken	Formerly Canon of Winchester (1669–1685). Nominated on 24 November 1684 and consecrated on 25 January 1685. Deprived of the see on 1 February 1690 for not taking the oaths to the sovereigns. Died on 19 March 1711.
1691	1703	Richard Kidder	Formerly Dean of Peterborough (1689–1691). Nominated on 11 June and consecrated on 30 August 1691. Died in office on 26 November 1703.
1704	1727	George Hooper	Translated from St Asaph. Nominated on 23 December 1703 and confirmed on 14 March 1704. Died in office on 6 September 1727.
1727	1743	John Wynne	Translated from St Asaph. Nominated on 19 September and confirmed on 11 November 1727. Died in office on 15 July 1743.
1743	1773	Edward Willes	Translated from St David's. Nominated on 13 September and confirmed on 12 December 1743. Died in office on 24 November 1773.
1774	1802	Charles Moss	Translated from St David's. Nominated on 23 April and confirmed on 2 June 1774. Died in office on 13 April 1802.
1802	1824	Richard Beadon	Translated from Gloucester. Nominated on 27 April and confirmed on 2 June 1802. Died in office on 21 April 1824.
1824	1845	George Henry Law	Translated from Chester. Nominated on 8 May and confirmed on 8 June 1824. Died in office on 22 September 1845.
1845	1854	Richard Bagot	Translated from Oxford. Nominated on 15 October and confirmed on 12 November 1845. Died in office on 15 May 1854.
1854	1869	The Lord Auckland	Translated from Bishop of Sodor and Man. Nominated on 2 June and confirmed on 1 July 1854. Resigned as bishop on 6 September 1869 and died on 25 April 1870.
1869	1894	Lord Arthur Hervey	Formerly Archdeacon of Sudbury (1862–1869). Nominated on 11 November and consecrated 21 December 1869. Died in office on 9 June 1894.
1894	1921	George Kennion	Translated from Adelaide in Australia. Nominated on 24 August and confirmed on 17 October 1894. Resigned on 1 August 1921 and died on 19 May 1922.
1921	1937	Basil Wynne Willson	Nominated on 6 October and consecrated on 1 November 1921. Resigned on 1 October 1937 and died on 15 October 1946.
1937	1943	Francis Underhill	Nominated on 6 October and consecrated on 30 November 1937. Died in office on 24 January 1943.
1943	1945	William Wand	Translated from Brisbane. Nominated on 23 September and confirmed on 27 October 1943. Translated to London on 22 August 1945.
1946	1960	Harold Bradfield	Nominated on 5 March and consecrated on 1 May 1946. Died in office on 1 May 1960.
1960	1975	Edward Henderson	Translated from Tewkesbury. Nominated on 1 July and confirmed 19 July 1960. Resigned on 31 May 1975 and died in 1986.
1975	1986	John Bickersteth	Translated from Warrington. Nominated on 15 October and confirmed on 12 December 1975. Also Clerk of the Closet (1979–1989). Retired in 1986.
1986	1991	George Carey	Formerly Principal of Trinity Theological College, Bristol (1982–1988). Nominated and consecrated bishop in 1986. Translated to Canterbury in 1991.
1991	2001	Jim Thompson	Translated from Stepney. Nominated and confirmed in 1991. Retired in 2001 and died in 2003.
2002	2013	Peter Price	Translated from Kingston-upon-Thames. Nominated in 2001 and enthroned in 2002. Retired on 30 June 2013.
4 March 2014	May 2021	Peter Hancock	Translated from Basingstoke, 4 March 2014. Nominated in December 2013 and installed on 7 June 2014; retired May 2021.
2022	onwards	Michael Beasley	Previously Bishop of Hertford. Election confirmed on 29 June 2022.

== Assistant bishops ==
Among those who have served as assistant bishops of the diocese are:

- 4 October 1852 – 10 May 1853 (res.): George Spencer, commissary during Bagot's illness, and former Bishop in Madras
- late 1860s (Eden's illness): James Chapman, Coadjutor-Bishop, Rector of Wootton Courtenay, a Prebendary of Wells and former Bishop of Colombo
- 1891–1900: Charles Bromby, former Bishop of Tasmania (lived at Clifton with his son)
- 1931 – 1942 (d.): Charles de Salis, Archdeacon of Taunton until 1938, and former Bishop of Taunton
- 1940 – 1943 (res.): Edmund Sara, former Coadjutor Bishop of Jamaica and later Assistant Bishop of Hereford
- 1950–1967 (ret.): Fabian Jackson, Rector of Batcombe and former Bishop of Trinidad
- 1956 – 1973 (ret.): Douglas Wilson, Canon Treasurer of Wells and former Bishop of Trinidad

== In popular culture ==
=== Television ===
Monty Python features two skits in which the Bishop of this title is mentioned.

The 1980s BBC historical sitcom Blackadder features an episode entitled Money in which Hollywood actor Ronald Lacey plays an obese, blasphemous, self-confessed pervert who describes himself as "the baby-eating Bishop of Bath and Wells!"

=== Radio ===
Absolute Power, BBC radio comedy features such a Bishop.

=== Literature ===
Neil Gaiman's 2008 work The Graveyard Book features a character named the Bishop of Bath and Wells – he is one of a trio of ghouls who spirit the main character away.

Ralph of Shrewsbury, Bishop of Bath and Wells, appears as a character in the 1994 fantasy novel The Dragon, The Earl and The Troll, by Gordon Dickson.

== Bibliography ==
- Fryde, E. B.; Greenway, D. E.; Porter, S.; Roy, I., eds. (1986). Handbook of British Chronology (3rd, reprinted 2003 ed.). Cambridge: Cambridge University Press. ISBN 0-521-56350-X.
