= 10th century in England =

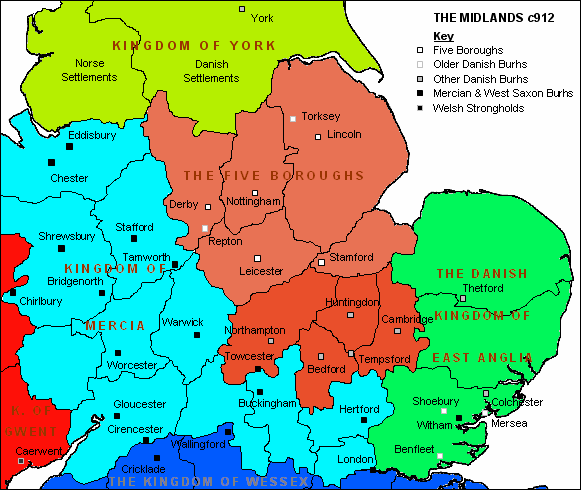
Map of the Midlands, England, 912

Events from the 10th century in the Kingdom of England.

The kingdoms of Britain in 927

== Events ==
- 902
  - Irish Norsemen, expelled from Dublin, establish colonies on The Wirral.
- 909
  - King Edward the Elder and his sister, Princess Æthelflæd of Mercia, raid Danish East Anglia and bring back the relics of St. Oswald in triumph. Æthelflæd translates them to the new minster in Gloucester, which is renamed St. Oswald's Priory in his honour.
  - Edward dispatches an Anglo-Saxon army to attack the Northumbrian Vikings and ravages Scandinavian York.
  - The Dioceses of Bath and of Crediton are separated from that of Sherborne, Athelm being appointed first Bishop of Wells and Eadwulf of Crediton. Æthelweard briefly serves as Bishop of Sherborne at about this time.
- 910–920
  - Edward the Elder, King of Wessex, and his sister, Æthelflæd, Lady of the Mercians, conquer most of the Danelaw.
- 910
  - 5 August – Battle of Tettenhall: Edward the Elder, King of Wessex, allied with the forces of Mercia, defeats a Northumbrian Viking army; Eowils and Halfdan and Ingwær, kings of Northumbria, are killed.
- 911
  - Edward transfers London and Oxford from Mercia to Wessex.
  - Æthelred, Lord of the Mercians, dies and his wife Æthelflæd takes over rule as Lady of the Mercians.
- 912
  - Æthelflæd of Mercia begins to establish fortified burhs, including one at Bridgnorth.
- 913
  - Æthelflæd rebuilds the ruined town of Tamworth as a burh and capital of Mercia, also establishing a burh at Stafford.
- 914
  - Æthelflæd of Mercia establishes Eddisbury and Warwick as burhs.
- 915
  - First Battle of Corbridge: Viking victory over the Anglo-Saxons.
  - King Edward occupies Bedford.
  - Æthelflæd of Mercia establishes Chirbury and Runcorn as burhs.
- 917
  - King Edward captures Derby and seizes control of East Anglia. All Danes south of the Humber submit to his rule.
- 918
  - 12 June – Æthelflæd of Mercia dies at Tamworth; Edward the Elder takes control of her kingdom.
  - Welsh kings pay homage to Edward.
  - Second Battle of Corbridge.
- 919
  - Ragnall ua Ímair seizes control of the Kingdom of York.
- 920
  - Norse Vikings under Sitric Cáech attack Cheshire.
  - Constantine II of Scotland, and the kings of Strathclyde, York, and Northumbria acknowledge Edward the Elder as their overlord.
- c. 923
  - Athelm enthroned as Archbishop of Canterbury.
- 924
  - 17 July – Edward the Elder dies and is succeeded by Æthelstan as King of Wessex.
- 925
  - 4 September – coronation of Æthelstan as King of Wessex at Kingston upon Thames.
- 926
  - 8 January – death of Athelm, Archbishop of Canterbury. He will be succeeded by Wulfhelm.
  - 30 January – a sister of King Æthelstan, perhaps Edith of Polesworth, is married to Sitric Cáech, the squint-eyed Norse King of Northumbria and Dublin (died 927), in Tamworth.
  - Possible date (or 936?) – Conan is nominated as Bishop of Cornwall by Æthelstan.
- 927
  - King Æthelstan occupies York following the death of Sitric Cáech.
  - 12 July – King Æthelstan of Wessex claims his kingdom and receives the submission of High-Reeve Ealdred I of Bamburgh and probably also of Owain ap Dyfnwal, King of Strathclyde, at Eamont Bridge. He unifies the various small kingdoms of the Anglo-Saxon Heptarchy, creating the Kingdom of England, and also secures a pledge from King Constantine II of Scotland, that he will not ally with the Viking kings. This summer also Kings Hywel Dda of Deheubarth and Owain of Glywysing and Gwent submit to the overlordship of Æthelstan at Hereford.
- 928
  - King Æthelstan sets the border between England and Wales at the River Wye.
  - King Æthelstan asserts authority over the Cornish, and sets the border of Cornwall at the River Tamar.
  - The scribe known as "Æthelstan A" begins to draft royal charters.
- 931
  - Æthelstan holds the first Council of All England, at Colchester.
- 933
  - Æthelstan founds Milton Abbey in Dorset.
- 934
  - Æthelstan invades Scotland, reaching as far as Caithness.
- 935
  - Approximate date – Æthelstan mints the first coins proclaiming himself to be "King of All Britain" (Rex To[tius] Brit[anniae]).
- 937
  - Battle of Brunanburh: King Æthelstan defeats Olaf Guthfrithson, the Norse King of Dublin, Constantine II, King of Scots, and Owain ap Dyfnwal, King of the Cumbrians. In thanksgiving for his victory, on his return Æthelstan grants Beverley Minster collegiate status (according to legend).
- 939
  - Failed expedition to support King Louis IV of France against Otto, King of East Francia.
  - 27 October – King Æthelstan dies at Gloucester; he is buried at Malmesbury Abbey and succeeded by his half-brother Edmund I.
  - King Olaf Guthfrithson captures York.
- 940
  - King Edmund cedes Northumbria and the Five Boroughs of the Danelaw to Olaf Guthfrithson.
  - King Edmund summons Dunstan to his court, where he becomes a favourite, and appoints him Abbot of Glastonbury, where he initiates English Benedictine Reform and revival.
- 941
  - King Olaf Guthfrithson dies; Amlaíb Cuarán (Óláfr Sigtryggsson) succeeds him as King of Northumbria.
  - 12 February – death of Wulfhelm, Archbishop of Canterbury.
  - Oda enthroned as Archbishop of Canterbury.
- 942
  - King Edmund re-captures the Five Boroughs.
- 943
  - Vikings take Tamworth.
- 944
  - King Edmund takes York from the Vikings.
- 945
  - King Edmund invades Strathclyde, and grants Cumbria to King Malcolm I of Scotland.
- 946
  - 26 May – King Edmund is murdered by an exiled criminal at Pucklechurch and succeeded by his brother Eadred of England who is crowned on 16 August at Kingston upon Thames.
- 947
  - Wulfstan I, Archbishop of York invites the Viking leader Eric Bloodaxe to become King of Northumbria.
  - First record of Horsham.
- 948
  - King Eadred expels Eric Bloodaxe from Northumbria.
  - King Malcolm I of Scotland raids Northumbria.
- 949
  - Óláfr Sigtryggsson returns as King of Northumbria.
- 952
  - Eric Bloodaxe reconquers York.
  - King Eadred imprisons Wulfstan of York.
- 954
  - Eric Bloodaxe is killed at Stainmore allowing King Eadred to recover York, reuniting the kingdom of Northumbria with that of England, under the administration of Osulf I of Bamburgh.
- 955
  - 23 November – King Eadred dies at Frome and is succeeded by his nephew Eadwig.
- 956
  - Dunstan exiled after quarreling with King Eadwig.
- 957
  - Dunstan re-founds abbeys at Bath, Exeter, Malmesbury, and Westminster.
  - Mercia and Northumbria rebel, choosing Edgar as King.
- 958
  - 2 June – death of Oda of Canterbury, Archbishop of Canterbury.
- 959
  - Ælfsige enthroned as Archbishop of Canterbury but dies en route to Rome.
  - Byrhthelm enthroned as Archbishop of Canterbury.
  - 1 October – King Edwig dies and is succeeded by his brother Edgar the Peaceful. Edgar overturns the appointment of Byrhthelm as Archbishop of Canterbury in favour of Dunstan.
- 960
  - 21 September – Dunstan receives the pallium as Archbishop of Canterbury from Pope John XII.
- 961
  - Saint Oswald becomes Bishop of Worcester; he establishes or re-founds abbeys at Ramsey, Cambridgeshire, Evesham, Pershore, and Winchcombe. Ordgar, Ealdorman of Devon, founds Tavistock Abbey.
- 963
  - King Edgar grants legal autonomy to the Danelaw.
  - Æthelwold becomes Bishop of Winchester; re-founds abbeys at Ely and (about 966) Peterborough (Medeshamstede).
- c. 970
  - Regularis Concordia produced at Winchester.
  - Oak tree begins growing in what will become Blenheim Park in Oxfordshire which will still be living in the second decade of the 21st century.
- 971
  - 15 July – the planned removal of the body of Saint Swithun during the re-building of Winchester Cathedral is delayed by 40 days due to rain.
  - Kenneth II of Scotland raids England, reaching as far as Yorkshire.
- 973
  - 11 May – coronation of King Edgar at Bath.
  - Edgar sails to Chester, and receives homage from the rulers of Alba, Strathclyde, Wales, and the Kingdom of the Isles.
  - Edgar has the coinage called in and re-struck as uniform pennies.
- 975
  - 8 July – King Edgar dies and is succeeded by his 12-year-old son Edward.
- 978
  - 18 March – King Edward is murdered by the servants of his stepmother Queen Ælfthryth at Corfe Castle. He is succeeded by his stepbrother Æthelred the Unready.
- 980
  - Vikings begin a new wave of raids on England.
- 981
  - 13 February – start of a 7-day procession in which the bones of St Edward the Martyr are translated from Wareham to Shaftesbury Abbey, overseen by Dunstan and Ælfhere, Ealdorman of Mercia.
  - Viking raids on Dorset, Devon, and Cornwall begin, and continue for a further seven years.
- 985
  - King Æthelred grants lands at Hēatūn to Lady Wulfrun by royal charter, thus founding what will become Wolverhampton.
- 986
  - Cholsey Abbey, a nunnery, is founded in the upper Thames valley by dowager queen Ælfthryth.
- 988
  - 19 May – death of Dunstan, Archbishop of Canterbury. He is succeeded by Æthelgar.
- 990
  - 13 February – death of Æthelgar, Archbishop of Canterbury.
  - Sigeric the Serious enthroned as Archbishop of Canterbury.
- 991
  - 1 March – Æthelred signs a treaty with Duke Richard I of Normandy, by which each agrees not to aid the others' enemies.
  - August – Norse invasion force sacks Ipswich.
  - 10 August – Battle of Maldon: Danes defeat the English army, whose leader, Byrhtnoth, is killed.
  - The first Danegeld, of £10,000, is paid to the Danes in return for their leaving England (according to the Anglo-Saxon Chronicle).
- 993
  - Danes raid Northumbria, destroying the original fortifications at Bamburgh Castle.
- 994
  - Norse and Danish armies ravage the south-east, but fail to capture London.
  - £16,000 of Danegeld paid.
  - Olaf II of Norway is baptised at Andover, and swears not to return to England.
- 995
  - Ælfric of Abingdon enthroned as Archbishop of Canterbury.
  - Aldhun, Bishop of Lindisfarne, moves his episcopal see from Chester-le-Street to Durham, to which the remains of Saint Cuthbert (d. 687) are translated.
  - Ælfric of Eynsham completes his Catholic Homilies.
- 997
  - King Æthelred issues a law code at Wantage, defining the legal position in the Danelaw and introducing trial by jury.
  - Ælfric of Eynsham completes the English Lives of Saints.
- 998
  - Danes raid southern and western coasts.
- 999
  - Danes raid Kent, attacking Rochester.
- 1000
  - English fleet invades the Isle of Man.
  - English invasion of Cumbria fails.
  - Heroic poem The Battle of Maldon composed.

== Births ==
- 902
  - Dunstan, Archbishop of Canterbury (died 988)
- 922
  - King Edmund I of England (died 946)
- 923
  - King Eadred of England (died 955)
- 943/44
  - King Edgar of England (died 975)
- c. 950
  - Sigeric the Serious, Archbishop of Canterbury (died 994)
- c. 955
  - Ælfric of Eynsham, abbot and religious writer (died 1010)
- c. 962
  - King Edward the Martyr (died 978)
- 968
  - King Æthelred the Unready (died 1016)

== Deaths ==
- 902
  - 5 December – Ealhswith, queen consort of Alfred the Great
- 904
  - John the Old Saxon, Abbot of Athelney (approximate date)
- 908
  - Denewulf, Bishop of Winchester
- 909 – approximate date
  - Asser, Bishop of Sherborne and scholar
  - Wighelm, probable Bishop of Selsey
- 911
  - Æthelred, Lord of the Mercians
- 912
  - Wilferth, Bishop of Lichfield (approximate date)
- 913
  - Eadwulf II of Northumbria (killed)
- 914 or 923
  - 2 August – Plegmund, Archbishop of Canterbury
- 915
  - Cutheard of Lindisfarne, bishop (approximate date)
- 917
  - Guthrum II, presumed king of East Anglia
- 918
  - 12 June – Æthelflæd, Lady of the Mercians (born c. 870)
- 920 or 922
  - Æthelweard (son of Alfred)
- 921
  - Ragnall ua Ímair, Norse King of Northumbria and Mann
- 924
  - 17 July – Edward the Elder, King of Wessex (born c. 871)
  - 2 August – Ælfweard of Wessex, King of Wessex
- 926
  - 8 January – Athelm, Archbishop of Canterbury
- 927
  - Sitric Cáech, Norse King of Northumbria
- 939
  - 27 October – Æthelstan, King of England (born c. 895)
- 941
  - 12 February – Wulfhelm, Archbishop of Canterbury
- 946
  - 26 May – King Edmund I of England (born 922)
- 951/3
  - 15 June – Eadburh of Winchester, princess and nun
- 954
  - Eric Bloodaxe, Norse King of Northumbria (born c. 895)
- 955
  - 23 November – King Eadred of England (born c. 923)
- 958
  - Oda, Archbishop of Canterbury
- 959
  - Ælfsige, Archbishop of Canterbury
- c. 962/3
  - Æthelwald, Ealdorman of East Anglia
- 971
  - Ordgar, Ealdorman of Devon
- 973
  - 15 May – Byrhthelm, Archbishop of Canterbury
- 975
  - 8 July – King Edgar of England (born c. 943)
- 977
  - 30 April–2 May – Sideman, Bishop of Crediton
- 978
  - 18 March – King Edward the Martyr (born c. 962)
- 983
  - 8 July – Ælfwynn, wife of Æthelstan Half-King
- 988
  - Dunstan, Archbishop of Canterbury (born c. 909)
- 990
  - 13 February – Æthelgar, Archbishop of Canterbury
- 994
  - 28 October – Sigeric the Serious, Archbishop of Canterbury (born c. 950)
