= Oswulf =

Oswulf may refer to

- Oswulf of Northumbria, King of Northumbria 758-59
- Oswulf of Ramsbury, Bishop of Ramsbury c. 949 to 970
