= Bishop of Ramsbury (ancient) =

Former episcopal title used by medieval English-Catholic diocesan bishops

The Bishop of Ramsbury was an episcopal title used by medieval English-Catholic diocesan bishops in the Anglo-Saxon English church. The title takes its name from the village of Ramsbury in Wiltshire, and was first used in the 10th and 11th centuries by the Anglo-Saxon Bishops of Ramsbury. In Saxon times, Ramsbury was an important location for the Church, and several early bishops became Archbishops of Canterbury.

The ancient bishopric of Ramsbury was created in 909 by Plegmund, Archbishop of Canterbury, as part of a division of the two West Saxon bishoprics into five smaller ones. Wiltshire and Berkshire were taken from the bishopric of Winchester to form the new diocese of Ramsbury. It was occasionally referred to as the bishopric of Ramsbury and Sonning. In 1058 it was joined with the bishopric of Sherborne to form the diocese of Sarum (Salisbury), and the see was translated to Old Sarum in 1075.

== Medieval bishops diocesan ==
Bishops of Ramsbury
From	Until	Incumbent	Notes
909	927	Aethelstan	
927	942	Saint Oda of Canterbury	Translated to Canterbury in 942.
942	949	Ælfric	
952	970	Oswulf	
970	981	Ælfstan	
981	985	Wulfgar	
985	990	Sigeric the Serious	Translated to Canterbury in 990.
990	1005	Saint Ælfric of Abingdon	Translated to Canterbury in 995, he continued to hold Ramsbury along with Canterbury until his death.
995	1045	Saint Bertwald	Also spelled Britwold, Beorhtwald, Birthwald, Brithwald, Berhtwald, Birthwold, Brihtwald, and Britwaldus and variously known as '... of Ramsbury', '... of Glastonbury' and '... of Sarum' Sometimes confused with Berhtwald of Canterbury
1045	1075	Herman	In exile from 1055 to 1058 (when the see was administered by Ealdred, Bishop of Worcester.) Also Bishop of Sherborne from 1058.
Herman removed both of his sees to Old Sarum in 1075; for later bishops of that merged diocese, see Bishop of Salisbury.

== Modern titles ==
Since 1974 the Bishop of Ramsbury is a suffragan see of the Diocese of Salisbury. There is also a titular see of the Roman Catholic Church, namely Bishop of Ramsbiria, the Latin term for Ramsbury.
