= Dunstan =

Archbishop of Canterbury from 959 to 988, Christian saint

Saint Dunstan OSB
- Archbishop of Canterbury
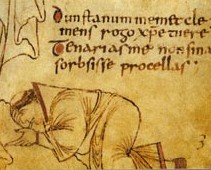
- Possible self-portrait; detail from the Glastonbury Classbook
- Installed: 959
- Term ended: 988
- Predecessor: Byrhthelm
- Successor: Æthelgar

Personal details
- Born: c. 909 Baltonsborough, Wessex
- Died: 19 May 988 (aged about 79) Canterbury, England
- Buried: Canterbury Cathedral

Sainthood
- Feast day: 19 May
- Venerated in: Catholic Church; Eastern Orthodox Church; Anglican Communion
- Canonized: 1029
- Attributes: Man holding a pair of smith's tongs; with a dove hovering near him; with a troop of angels before him
- Patronage: Blacksmiths; goldsmiths; locksmiths; musicians; silversmiths; bellringers; Charlottetown, Canada; Stepney
- Shrines: Canterbury Cathedral (but also claimed by Glastonbury Abbey), both destroyed

Dunstan (Note: Latin: Dunstanus) (c. 909 – 19 May 988) was an English bishop and Benedictine monk. He was successively Abbot of Glastonbury Abbey, Bishop of Worcester, Bishop of London and Archbishop of Canterbury, later canonised. His work restored monastic life in England and reformed the English Church. His 11th-century biographer Osbern, himself an artist and scribe, states that Dunstan was skilled in "making a picture and forming letters", as were other clergy of his age who reached senior rank.

Dunstan served as an important minister of state to several English kings. He was the most popular saint in England for nearly two centuries, having gained fame for the many stories of his greatness, not least among which were those concerning his famed cunning in defeating the Devil.

== Early life (909–943) ==
=== Birth and relatives ===
According to Dunstan's earliest biographer, known only as 'B', (Note: A charter of 955 is only attested by three clerical witnesses below the status of bishop, Dunstan and two deacons, Byrhthelm and Æthelferth, and Michael Lapidge suggests that the deacons were Dunstan's personal secretaries and Byrhthelm may have been 'B'.) his parents were called Heorstan and Cynethryth and they lived near Glastonbury. B states that Dunstan was "oritur" in the days of King Æthelstan, 924 to 939. "Oritur" has often been taken to mean "born", but this is unlikely as another source states that he was ordained during Æthelstan's reign, and he would have been under the minimum age of 30 if he was born no earlier than 924. It is more likely that "oritur" should be taken as "emerged" and that he was born around 910. B states that he was related to Ælfheah the Bald, the Bishop of Winchester and Cynesige, Bishop of Lichfield. According to a later biographer, Adelard of Ghent, he was a nephew of Athelm, Archbishop of Canterbury, but this is less certain as it is not mentioned by B, who should have known as he had been a member of Dunstan's household.

=== School to the king's court ===
As a young boy, Dunstan studied under the Irish monks who then occupied the diminished community at Glastonbury Abbey.

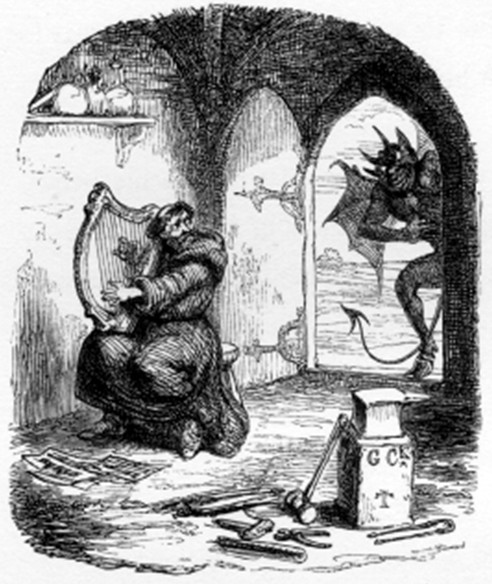
Dunstan playing his harp as the Devil is paying a visit

Dunstan soon became a favourite of the king and was the envy of other members of the court. A plot was hatched to disgrace him and Dunstan was accused of being involved with witchcraft and black magic. The king ordered him to leave the court and as Dunstan was leaving the palace his enemies physically attacked him, beat him severely, bound him, and threw him into a cesspool. He managed to crawl out and make his way to the house of a friend. From there, he journeyed to Winchester and entered the service of his kinsman Ælfheah, Bishop of Winchester.

The bishop tried to persuade him to become a monk, but Dunstan was doubtful whether he had a vocation to a celibate life. The answer came in the form of an attack of swelling tumours all over Dunstan's body. This ailment was so severe that it was thought to be leprosy. It was more probably some form of blood poisoning caused by being beaten and thrown in the cesspool. Whatever the cause, it changed Dunstan's mind. He took Holy Orders in 943, in the presence of Ælfheah, and returned to live the life of a hermit at Glastonbury. Against the old church of St Mary he built a small cell 5 feet (1.5 m) long and 2 1/2 feet (0.76 m) deep. It was there that Dunstan studied, worked at his art, and played on his harp. It is at this time, according to a late 11th-century legend, that the Devil is said to have tempted Dunstan and to have been held by the face with Dunstan's tongs.

== Monk and abbot (943–957) ==
=== Life as a monk ===
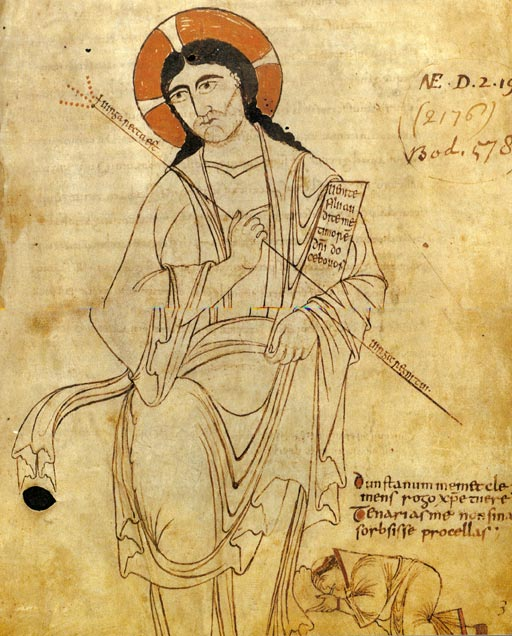
Possibly Dunstan praying before Christ

Dunstan worked as a silversmith and in the scriptorium while he was living at Glastonbury. It is thought likely that he was the artist who drew the well-known image of Christ with a small kneeling monk beside him in the Glastonbury Classbook, "one of the first of a series of outline drawings which were to become a special feature of Anglo-Saxon art of this period." Dunstan became famous as a musician, illuminator, and metalworker. Lady Æthelflæd, King Æthelstan's niece, made Dunstan a trusted adviser and on her death, she left a considerable fortune to him. He used this money later in life to foster and encourage a monastic revival in England. About the same time, his father Heorstan died and Dunstan inherited his fortune as well. He became a person of great influence, and on the death of King Æthelstan in 940, the new King, Edmund, summoned him to his court at Cheddar and made him a minister.

Again, royal favour fostered jealousy among other courtiers and again Dunstan's enemies succeeded in their plots. The King was prepared to send Dunstan away. There were then at Cheddar certain envoys from the "Eastern Kingdom", which probably meant East Anglia. Dunstan implored the envoys to take him with them when they returned to their homes. They agreed to do so, but it never happened. The story is recorded:

... the king rode out to hunt the stag in Mendip Forest. He became separated from his attendants and followed a stag at great speed in the direction of the Cheddar cliffs. The stag rushed blindly over the precipice and was followed by the hounds. Eadmund endeavoured vainly to stop his horse; then, seeing death to be imminent, he remembered his harsh treatment of St Dunstan and promised to make amends if his life was spared. At that moment his horse was stopped on the very edge of the cliff. Giving thanks to God, he returned forthwith to his palace, called for St. Dunstan and bade him follow, then rode straight to Glastonbury. Entering the church, the king first knelt in prayer before the altar, then, taking St. Dunstan by the hand, he gave him the kiss of peace, led him to the abbot's throne and, seating him thereon, promised him all assistance in restoring Divine worship and regular observance.

— Toke 1909

=== Abbot of Glastonbury ===
Dunstan, now Abbot of Glastonbury, went to work at once on the task of reform. He had to re-create monastic life and to rebuild the abbey. He began by establishing Benedictine monasticism at Glastonbury. The Rule of St. Benedict was the basis of his restoration according to the author of 'Edgar's Establishment of the Monasteries' (written in the 960s or 970s) and according to Dunstan's first biographer, who had been a member of the community at Glastonbury. Their statements are also in accordance with the nature of his first measures as abbot, with the significance of his first buildings, and with the Benedictine leanings of his most prominent disciples.

Nevertheless, not all the members of Dunstan's community at Glastonbury were monks who followed the Benedictine Rule. In fact, Dunstan's first biographer, 'B.', was a cleric who eventually joined a community of canons at Liège after leaving Glastonbury.

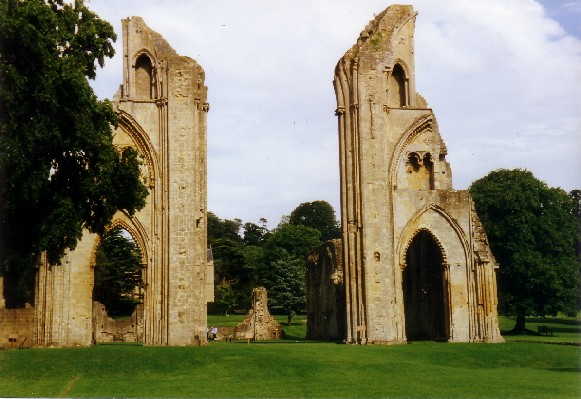
Remains of the choir of Glastonbury Abbey church

Dunstan's first care was to rebuild the Church of St. Peter, rebuild the cloister, and re-establish the monastic enclosure. The secular affairs of the house were committed to his brother, Wulfric, "so that neither himself nor any of the professed monks might break enclosure." A school for the local youth was founded and soon became the most famous of its time in England. A substantial extension of the irrigation system on the surrounding Somerset Levels was also completed.

Within two years of Dunstan's appointment, in 946, King Edmund was assassinated. His successor was Eadred. The policy of the new government was supported by the Queen mother, Eadgifu of Kent, by the Archbishop of Canterbury, Oda, and by the East Anglian nobles, at whose head was the powerful ealdorman Æthelstan the "Half-king". It was a policy of unification and conciliation with the Danish half of the kingdom. The goal was a firm establishment of royal authority. In ecclesiastical matters it favoured the spread of Catholic observance, the rebuilding of churches, the moral reform of the clergy and laity, and the end of the religion of the Danes in England. These policies made Dunstan popular in the North of England, but unpopular in the South. Against all these reforms were the nobles of Wessex, who included most of Dunstan's own relatives, and who had an interest in maintaining established customs. For nine years Dunstan's influence was dominant, during which time he twice refused the office of bishop (that of Winchester in 951 and Crediton in 953), affirming that he would not leave the king's side so long as the king lived and needed him.

=== Changes in fortune ===
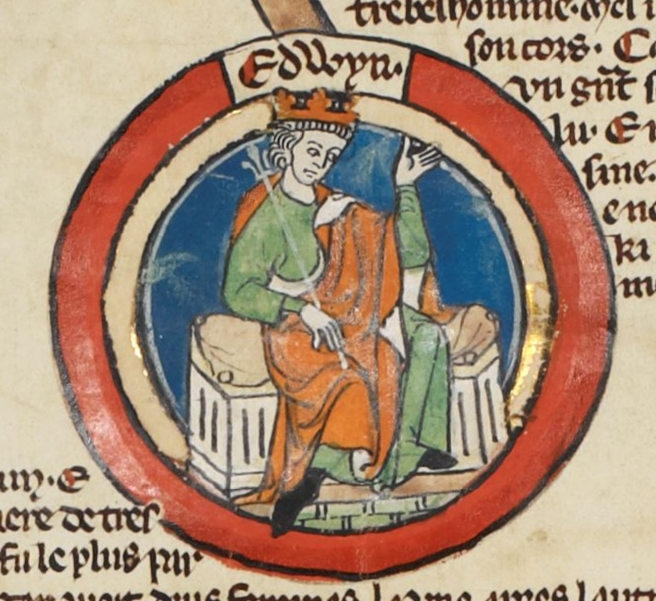
King Eadwig's reign was marred by conflicts with his family and with Dunstan.

In 955, Eadred died, and the situation was at once changed. Eadwig, the elder son of Edmund, who then came to the throne, was a headstrong youth wholly devoted to the reactionary nobles. According to one legend, the feud with Dunstan began on the day of Eadwig's coronation, when he failed to attend a meeting of nobles. When Dunstan eventually found the young monarch, he was cavorting with a noblewoman named Ælfgifu and her mother, and refused to return with the bishop. Infuriated by this, Dunstan dragged Eadwig back to the royal gathering.

Later realising that he had provoked the king, Dunstan saw that his life was in danger. He fled England and crossed the channel to Flanders, where he found himself ignorant of the language and of the customs of the locals. The count of Flanders, Arnulf I, received him with honour and lodged him in the Abbey of Mont Blandin, near Ghent. This was one of the centres of the Benedictine revival in that country, and Dunstan was able for the first time to observe the strict observance that had seen its rebirth at Cluny at the beginning of the century. His exile was not of long duration. Before the end of 957, the Mercians and Northumbrians revolted and drove out Eadwig, choosing his brother Edgar as king of the country north of the Thames. The south remained faithful to Eadwig. At once Edgar's advisers recalled Dunstan.

== Bishop and archbishop (957–978) ==
=== Bishop ===
On Dunstan's return, he was appointed a bishop. Dunstan's biographer "B" states that he was appointed Bishop of Worcester and then to London in plurality, but the historian Michael Lapidge thinks that it is more likely that he was appointed first to London and then to Worcester in plurality.

In October 959, Eadwig died and his brother Edgar was readily accepted as ruler of Wessex. One of Eadwig's final acts had been to appoint a successor to Archbishop Oda, who died on 2 June 958. The chosen candidate was Ælfsige of Winchester, but he died of cold in the Alps as he journeyed to Rome for the pallium. In his place Eadwig then nominated one of his supporters, the Bishop of Wells, Byrhthelm. As soon as Edgar became king, he reversed this second choice on the ground that Byrhthelm had not been able to govern even his first diocese properly. The archbishopric was then conferred on Dunstan.

=== Archbishop of Canterbury ===
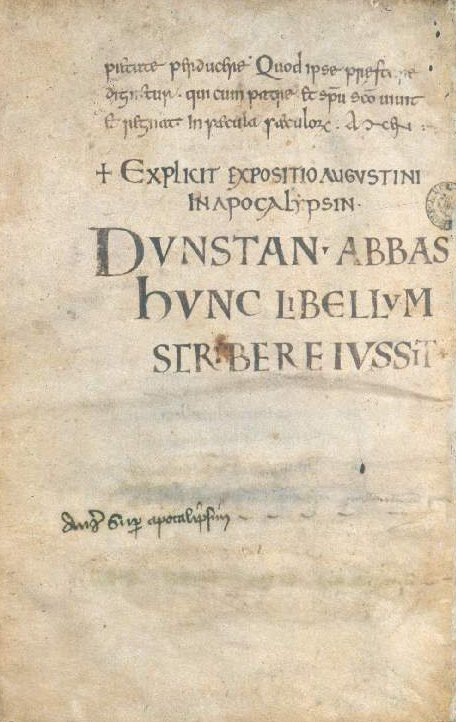
Theological manuscript from Glastonbury Abbey (Bodleian Library):Abbot Dunstan ordered the writing of this book.

Dunstan went to Rome in 960, and received the pallium from Pope John XII. On his journey there, Dunstan's acts of charity were so lavish as to leave nothing for himself and his attendants. His steward complained, but Dunstan seems to have suggested that they trust in Jesus Christ.

On his return from Rome, Dunstan at once regained his position as virtual prime minister of the kingdom. By his advice Ælfstan was appointed to the Bishopric of London, and Oswald to that of Worcester. In 963, Æthelwold, the Abbot of Abingdon, was appointed to the See of Winchester. With their aid and with the ready support of King Edgar, Dunstan pushed forward his reforms in the English Church. The monks in his communities were taught to live in a spirit of self-sacrifice, and Dunstan actively enforced the law of celibacy whenever possible. He forbade the practices of simony (selling ecclesiastical offices for money) and ended the custom of clerics appointing relatives to offices under their jurisdiction. Monasteries were built, and in some of the great cathedrals, monks took the place of the secular canons; in the rest the canons were obliged to live according to rule. The parish priests were compelled to be qualified for their office; they were urged to teach parishioners not only the truths of the Christian faith, but also trades to improve their position. The state saw reforms as well. Good order was maintained throughout the realm and there was respect for the law. Trained bands policed the north, and a navy guarded the shores from Viking raids.

In 973, Dunstan's statesmanship reached its zenith when he officiated at the coronation of King Edgar. Edgar was crowned at Bath in an imperial ceremony planned not as the initiation, but as the culmination of his reign (a move that must have taken a great deal of preliminary diplomacy). This service, devised by Dunstan himself and celebrated with a poem in the Anglo-Saxon Chronicle forms the basis of the present-day British coronation ceremony. There was a second symbolic coronation held later. This was an important step, as other kings of Britain came and gave their allegiance to Edgar at Chester. Six kings in Britain, including the kings of Scotland and of Strathclyde, pledged their faith that they would be the king's liege-men on sea and land.

Edgar ruled as a strong and popular king for 16 years. Edgar's reign, and implicitly his governing partnership with Dunstan, was praised by early chroniclers and historians who regarded it as a golden age. The Anglo-Saxon Chronicle caveated the acclaim with one complaint, criticising the high level of immigration that took place at that time. It would appear from William of Malmesbury's later history that the objection was limited to the mercenary seaman, employed from around the North Sea littoral, to assist in the defence of the country.

In 975, Edgar was succeeded by his eldest son Edward "the Martyr". His accession was disputed by his stepmother, Ælfthryth, who wished her own son Æthelred to reign. Through the influence of Dunstan, Edward was chosen and crowned at Winchester. Edgar's death had encouraged the reactionary nobles, and at once there was a determined attack upon the monks, the protagonists of reform. Throughout Mercia they were persecuted and deprived of their possessions. Their cause, however, was supported by Æthelwine, the ealdorman of East Anglia, and the realm was in serious danger of civil war. Three meetings of the Witan were held to settle these disputes, at Kyrtlington, at Calne, and at Amesbury. At the second of them the floor of the hall where the Witan was sitting gave way, and all except Dunstan, who clung to a beam, fell into the room below; several men were killed.

== Final years (978–88) ==
In March 978, King Edward was assassinated at Corfe Castle, possibly at the instigation of his stepmother, and Æthelred the Unready became king. The coronation took place on Low Sunday 31 March 978. According to William of Malmsesbury, writing over a century later, when the young king took the usual oath to govern well, Dunstan addressed him in solemn warning. He criticised the violent act whereby he became king and prophesied the misfortunes that were shortly to fall on the kingdom, but Dunstan's influence at court was ended. Dunstan retired to Canterbury, to teach at the cathedral school.

Only three more public acts are known. In 980, Dunstan joined Ælfhere of Mercia in the solemn translation of the relics of King Edward, soon to be regarded as a saint, from their grave at Wareham to a shrine at Shaftesbury Abbey. In 984, he persuaded King Æthelred to appoint Ælfheah as Bishop of Winchester in succession to Æthelwold. In 986, Dunstan induced the king, by a donation of 100 pounds of silver, to stop his persecution of the See of Rochester.

Dunstan's retirement at Canterbury consisted of long hours, both day and night, spent in private prayer, as well as his regular attendance at Mass and the daily office. He visited the shrines of St Augustine and St Æthelberht. He worked to improve the spiritual and temporal well-being of his people, to build and restore churches, to establish schools, to judge suits, to defend widows and orphans, to promote peace, and to enforce respect for purity. He practised his crafts, made bells and organs and corrected the books in the cathedral library. He encouraged and protected European scholars who came to England, and was active as a teacher of boys in the cathedral school. On Ascension Day 988, Dunstan said Mass and preached three times to the people: at the Gospel, at the benediction, and after the Agnus Dei. In this last address, he announced his impending death and wished his congregation well. That afternoon he chose the spot for his tomb, then went to his bed. His strength failed rapidly, and on Saturday morning, 19 May, he caused the clergy to assemble. Mass was celebrated in his presence, then he received Extreme Unction and the Viaticum, and died. Dunstan's final words are reported to have been, "He hath made a remembrance of his wonderful works, being a merciful and gracious Lord: He hath given food to them that fear Him."

The English people accepted him as a saint shortly thereafter. He was formally canonised in 1029. That year at the Synod of Winchester, St Dunstan's feast was ordered to be kept solemnly throughout England.

== Legacy ==
Until Thomas Becket's fame overshadowed Dunstan's, he was the favourite saint of the English people. Dunstan had been buried in his cathedral. In 1180 his relics were translated to a tomb on the south side of the high altar, when that building was restored after being partially destroyed by a fire in 1174.

The monks of Glastonbury used to claim that during the sack of Canterbury by the Danes in 1012, Dunstan's body had been carried for safety to their abbey. This story was disproved by Archbishop William Warham, who opened the tomb at Canterbury in 1508. They found Dunstan's relics still to be there. However, his shrine was destroyed during the English Reformation.

=== Patronage and feast day ===
Dunstan became patron saint of English goldsmiths and silversmiths because he worked as a silversmith making church plate. The Catholic Church and the Eastern Orthodox Church mark his feast day on 19 May. Dunstan is also honoured in the Church of England and in the Episcopal Church on 19 May.

In 2023, a pastoral area of the Catholic Diocese of Clifton was named in honour of Dunstan.

=== In literature and folklore ===
English literature contains many references to him: for example, in A Christmas Carol by Charles Dickens, (Note: "Foggier yet, and colder! Piercing, searching, biting cold. If the good Saint Dunstan had but nipped the Evil Spirit's nose with a touch of such weather as that, instead of using his familiar weapons, then, indeed, he would have roared to lusty purpose".) and in this folk rhyme:

St Dunstan, as the story goes,
Once pull'd the devil by the nose
With red-hot tongs, which made him roar,
That he was heard three miles or more.

This folk story is already shown in an initial in the Life of Dunstan in the Canterbury Passionale, from the second quarter of the 12th century (British Library, Harley MS 315, f. 15v.).

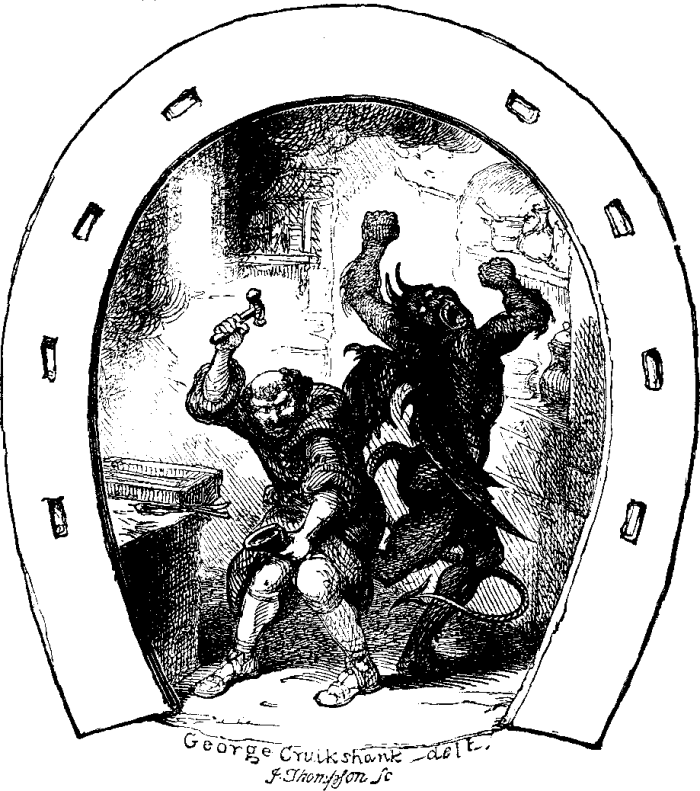
Dunstan shoeing the Devil's hoof, as illustrated by George Cruikshank

Daniel Anlezark has tentatively suggested that Dunstan may be the medieval author of the poem Solomon and Saturn, citing the style, word choice, and Hiberno-Latin used in the texts. However, Clive Tolley examines this claim from a linguistic point-of-view and disagrees with Anlezark's claim.

Another story relates how Dunstan nailed a horseshoe to the Devil's foot when he was asked to re-shoe the Devil's cloven hoof. This caused the Devil great pain, and Dunstan only agreed to remove the shoe and release the Devil after he promised never to enter a place where a horseshoe is over the door. This is claimed as the origin of the lucky horseshoe.

A further legend relating to Dunstan and the Devil relates to the last frosty nights of the year, said to often occur as late as St Dunstan’s Day, when apple trees are in blossom. On occurring so late, these frosts are known as “Franklin Nights”. The story goes that Dunstan was a great brewer and negotiated an agreement whereby the Devil could blast the blossom of local apple trees with frost, damaging the cider crop so that Dunstan's own beer would sell more readily.

=== An East London saint ===
As Bishop of London, Dunstan was also Lord of the Manor of Stepney, and may, like subsequent bishops, have lived there. Dunstan is recorded as having founded (or rebuilt) Stepney's church, in 952 AD. This church was dedicated to All Saints, but was rededicated to Dunstan after his canonisation in 1029, making Dunstan the patron saint of Stepney.

Christian titles
Preceded by Koenwald	Bishop of Worcester; 957–9	Succeeded by Oswald of Worcester
Preceded by Brihthelm	Bishop of London; 958–9	Succeeded by Ælfstan
Preceded by Byrhthelm	Archbishop of Canterbury; 959–88	Succeeded by Æthelgar
