= Ælfstan (bishop of Ramsbury) =

10th-century Bishop of Ramsbury

- Bishop of Ramsbury
- Appointed: 970
- Term ended: 12 February 981
- Predecessor: Oswulf
- Successor: Wulfgar

Orders
- Consecration: 970

Personal details
- Died: 12 February 981
- Denomination: Christian

Ælfstan (died 981) was a medieval Bishop of Ramsbury.

Ælfstan was consecrated in 970. He died on 12 February 981.

== Citations ==
Christian titles
Preceded by Oswulf	Bishop of Ramsbury; 970–981	Succeeded by Wulfgar
