= Byrhthelm (bishop of Wells) =

Archbishop of Canterbury in 959

- Bishop of Wells
- Province: Canterbury
- Appointed: 956
- Term ended: 973
- Predecessor: Wulfhelm II
- Successor: Cyneweard
- Other post: Archbishop of Canterbury

Orders
- Consecration: 956

Personal details
- Died: 15 May 973

Byrhthelm
- Archbishop of Canterbury
- Appointed: 959
- Term ended: 959
- Predecessor: Ælfsige
- Successor: Dunstan

Byrhthelm (Note: Also Beorhthelm, Birthelm, Birhelm, Brithelm or Brihthelm) (died 973) was the Bishop of Wells and briefly the archbishop of Canterbury. A monk from Glastonbury Abbey, he served as Bishop of Wells beginning in 956, then was translated to Canterbury in 959, only to be translated back to Wells in the same year.

In October 959, King Eadwig died and his brother Edgar was readily accepted as ruler of the Kingdom of England. One of the last acts of Eadwig had been to appoint a successor to Archbishop Oda, who died on 2 June 958. First he appointed Ælfsige of Winchester, but he perished of cold in the Alps as he journeyed to Rome for the pallium. In his place Eadwig nominated Byrhthelm. Byrhthelm was a supporter of Eadwig, and as soon as Edgar became king he reversed this act on the ground that Byrhthelm had not been able to even govern the Diocese of Wells properly. Edgar said that Byrhthelm was too gentle to maintain discipline, and he was replaced with Dunstan. He returned to Wells, where he served until he died on 15 May 973.

== Citations ==
Christian titles
Preceded by Wulfhelm II	Bishop of Wells; 956–973	Succeeded by Cyneweard
Preceded by Ælfsige	Archbishop of Canterbury; 959	Succeeded by Dunstan
