= Capture of the Five Boroughs =

Old English poem

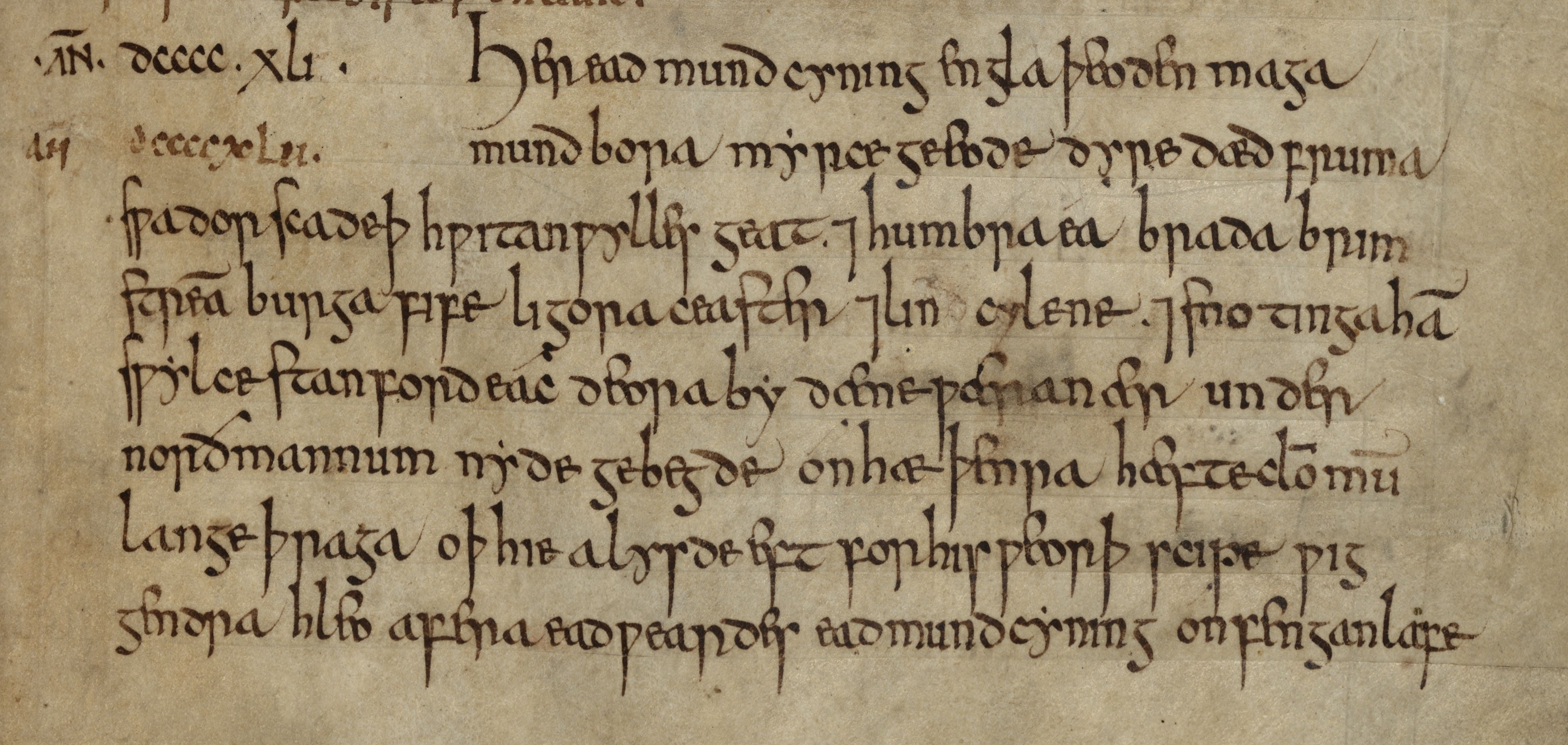
The text of the poem in MS A of the Anglo-Saxon Chronicle (f. 27r).

"Capture of the Five Boroughs" (also "Redemption of the Five Boroughs") is an Old English chronicle poem that commemorates the capture by King Edmund I of the so-called Five Boroughs of the Danelaw in 942.

The seven-line long poem is one of the five so-called "chronicle poems" found in the Anglo-Saxon Chronicle; it is preceded by "The Battle of Brunanburh" (937) and followed by the two poems on King Edgar. In the Parker MS, the text of "Brunanburh" is written by the same scribe as "Capture", which starts on the line for 941 but has the correct date added by another hand.

Frank Stenton comments that the poem "is overloaded with cliches", but also packs a lot of historical information, recording how the conquest of Mercia by King Edmund liberated, in 942, the people of the Five Boroughs (Leicester, Lincoln, Derby, Nottingham, Stamford) from the Norsemen under Olaf Guthfrithson and Amlaíb Cuarán. These people were not English—rather, they were Danes, who by this time considered themselves so English that they preferred King Edmund over their Norse overlords who had invaded their territory from Viking York. According to Sarah Foot, these "anglicised" Danes, liberated by Edmund, must thus have been Christian as well, and the poem aids in the construction of an English identity out of different ethnic groups united in their opposition to outside, pagan forces.

== Editions ==
"The Capture of the Five Boroughs" is edited by Martin Foys, with annotations and links to digital images of all six of its manuscript witnesses, with modern translation, in the Old English Poetry in Facsimile Project: https://oepoetryfacsimile.org/?document=8381
