= Alphege of Wells =

10th-century Bishop of Wells

- Bishop of Wells
- Appointed: 926
- Term ended: c. 937
- Predecessor: Wulfhelm
- Successor: Wulfhelm II

Orders
- Consecration: January 926

Personal details
- Died: c. 937
- Denomination: Christian

Alphege (or Ælfheah) was the third Anglo-Saxon Bishop of Wells. He was consecrated in January 926, and died around 937.

At the start of the reign of King Æthelstan in 924, Alphege was a member of his household, one of his mass priests, who were probably responsible for looking after his relics. Early in Æthelstan's reign, Alphege witnessed his manumission of a slave called Ealdred, and he also attested a charter on the day of Æthelstan's coronation, 4 September 925. He was appointed Bishop of Wells in succession to Wulfhelm, who had been translated to the Archbishopric of Canterbury.

== Citations ==
Christian titles
| Preceded by Wulfhelm | Bishop of Wells; 926–c. 937 | Succeeded by Wulfhelm II |
