= Æthelstan of Ramsbury =

10th-century Bishop of Ramsbury

Aethelstan
- Bishop of Ramsbury
- Appointed: c. 909
- Term ended: between 909 and 927
- Predecessor: new foundation
- Successor: Oda the Severe

Orders
- Consecration: c. 909

Personal details
- Died: between 909 and 927
- Denomination: Christian

Aethelstan was a medieval Bishop of Ramsbury.

Aethelstan was consecrated around 909. He died between 909 and 927.

== Citations ==
Christian titles
New title new foundation	Bishop of Ramsbury (ancient) c. 909– before 927	Succeeded by Oda the Severe
