= Wulfgar of Ramsbury =

10th-century Bishop of Ramsbury

Wulfgar
- Bishop of Ramsbury
- Appointed: 981
- Term ended: between 985 and 986
- Predecessor: Ælfstan
- Successor: Sigeric

Orders
- Consecration: 981

Personal details
- Died: between 985 and 986
- Denomination: Christian

Wulfgar was a medieval Bishop of Ramsbury.

Wulfgar was consecrated in 981. In Charter S 876 of 993 Wulfgar was named by King Æthelred the Unready as one of those who had led him astray when he turned against the advice of his mother and her allies in the 980s.

He died between 985 and 986.

== Citations ==
Christian titles
Preceded by Aelfstan	Bishop of Ramsbury; 981–c. 985	Succeeded by Sigeric
