= Ælfric of Ramsbury =

10th-century Bishop of Ramsbury

Ælfric
- Bishop of Ramsbury
- Appointed: between 941 and 949
- Term ended: between 949 and 950
- Predecessor: Oda the Severe
- Successor: Oswulf

Orders
- Consecration: 942

Personal details
- Died: between 949 and 950
- Denomination: Christian

Ælfric (Note: Old English: Ælfrīc) died c. 950) was a medieval Bishop of Ramsbury.

Ælfric was consecrated between 941 and 949. He died between 949 and 950. He was succeeded in his role by Oswulf.

== Notes ==
Christian titles
Preceded by Oda the Severe	Bishop of Ramsbury c. 945–c. 950	Succeeded by Oswulf
