= Oswulf of Ramsbury =

10th-century Bishop of Ramsbury

Oswulf
- Bishop of Ramsbury
- Appointed: between 949 and 951
- Term ended: 970
- Predecessor: Ælfric
- Successor: Ælfstan

Orders
- Consecration: between 949 and 950

Personal details
- Died: 970
- Denomination: Christian

Oswulf was a medieval Bishop of Ramsbury.

Oswulf was consecrated between 949 and 951. He died in 970. In the 940s Ealdorman Ealhhelm was given the lands of the then defunct Evesham Abbey, and on his death they were appropriated by thegn Wulfric and Bishop Oswulf.

== Citations ==
Christian titles
Preceded by Ælfric	Bishop of Ramsbury c. 949–970	Succeeded by Ælfstan
