= Wulfhelm =

Archbishop of Canterbury (died 941)

- Archbishop of Canterbury
- Appointed: c. 926
- Term ended: 12 February 941
- Predecessor: Athelm
- Successor: Oda
- Other post: Bishop of Wells

Orders
- Consecration: c. 924

Personal details
- Died: 12 February 941
- Buried: First church of St John the Baptist, Canterbury, later Canterbury Cathedral

Wulfhelm (died 12 February 941) was Bishop of Wells before being promoted to the Archbishopric of Canterbury about 926. Nothing is known about his time at Wells, but as archbishop he helped codify royal law codes and gave lands to monasteries. He went to Rome soon after his selection as archbishop. Two religious books that he gave to his cathedral are still extant.

== Biography ==
Wulfhelm was elected and consecrated Bishop of Wells between 923 and September 925. Nothing else is known about his time at Wells.

Wulfhelm was translated from the Bishopric of Wells to be Archbishop of Canterbury in about 926. While he was archbishop, he was a frequent attendee of the royal court, and King Æthelstan of England says in his law code that Wulfhelm was consulted on the drafting of the laws. Wulfhelm also advised the king on the Ordinance on Charities issued by Æthelstan. One of the surviving manuscripts of Æthelstan's laws has an epilogue that stated that the law was declared and decided at a synod held at Grately where Wulfhelm was present. From other parts of the laws issued by the king, it appears that Wulfhelm also presided at a council held at Thunderfield, at which the reeves of London pledged to keep the king's peace. The implication of the various accounts of the laws of Æthelstan is that Wulfhelm was highly involved in royal efforts to improve the law code.

Wulfhelm also went to Rome to receive his pallium in person from Pope John X. Why he chose to go to Rome in person for his pallium rather than having it sent to him like most of his predecessors is unknown. One suggestion has been that because he had been translated from another see, Wulfhelm felt the need to have papal approval of his translation made explicit. Given the low status of the papacy at the time, (Note: Some polemical tracts refer to the papacy at this time as the pornocracy (see Saeculum_obscurum).) it is unlikely that the impetus for the change in tradition came from the pope.

Wulfhelm died while archbishop on 12 February 941. During his time as archbishop, he received as gifts two gospels that are still extant, as Wulfhelm donated them to Christ Church. One of the gospels was produced in Ireland, the other either in Lotharingia or Germany. The second gospel may originally have been a gift to Æthelstan during the negotiations over the marriage of Æthelstan's sister Edith to the future Emperor Otto I. These diplomatic events probably explain the appearance of Wulfhelm's name in the confraternity books of some German monasteries. He may also have given land to the church, although the record is a bit unclear as to exactly what was given. Another grant of land was of land at Deverel, Wiltshire to Glastonbury Abbey while he was archbishop.

Wulfhelm was buried at Canterbury. He was buried at first the church of St John the Baptist near the Saxon-era Canterbury Cathedral. When a new cathedral was constructed under Archbishop Lanfranc after the Norman Conquest of England, the earlier archbishops of Canterbury were moved to the north transept of the new cathedral. Later, Wulfhelm and his predecessor as bishop and archbishop Athelm were moved to a chapel dedicated to St Benedict, which later was incorporated into the Lady Chapel constructed by Prior Thomas Goldstone (d. 1468).

== Citations ==
Christian titles
Preceded by Athelm	Bishop of Wells c. 923–c. 926	Succeeded by Alphege
Preceded by Athelm	Archbishop of Canterbury c. 926–941	Succeeded by Oda
