= Wulfhelm II =

10th-century Bishop of Wells

- Bishop of Wells
- Term ended: c. 956
- Predecessor: Alphege
- Successor: Byrhthelm

Orders
- Consecration: 938

Personal details
- Died: c. 956
- Denomination: Christian

Wulfhelm II, the fourth Anglo-Saxon Bishop of Wells, was consecrated in 938 and died around 956.

== Citations ==
Christian titles
Preceded by Alphege	Bishop of Wells c. 937–956	Succeeded by Byrhthelm
