= Athelm =

Archbishop of Canterbury, Christian saint (died 926)

Saint Athelm
- Archbishop of Canterbury
- Appointed: between 923 and 925
- Term ended: 8 January 926
- Predecessor: Plegmund
- Successor: Wulfhelm
- Other post: Bishop of Wells

Personal details
- Died: 8 January 926
- Buried: first church of St John the Baptist in Canterbury, later Canterbury Cathedral

Sainthood
- Feast day: 8 January
- Venerated in: Eastern Orthodox Church; Roman Catholic Church
- Canonized: Pre-Congregation

Athelm (or Æthelhelm; died 8 January 926) was an English churchman, who was the first Bishop of Wells, and later Archbishop of Canterbury. His translation, or moving from one bishopric to another, was a precedent for later translations of ecclesiastics, because prior to this time period such movements were considered illegal. While archbishop, Athelm crowned King Æthelstan, and perhaps wrote the coronation service for the event. He was the uncle of Dunstan, a later Archbishop of Canterbury, Athelm helped promote Dunstan's early career. After Athelm's death, he was considered a saint, with his feast day being on 8 January.

== Background ==
Athelm was a monk of Glastonbury Abbey before his elevation in 909 to the see of Wells, of which he was the first occupant. The see was founded to divide up the diocese of Sherborne, which was very large, by creating a bishopric for the county of Somerset. Wells was likely chosen as the seat because it was the center of the county. Some scholarly works suggest that Athelm may be the same person as Æthelhelm, son of King Æthelred of Wessex, but this is not accepted by most historians. A few sources state that Athelm was Abbot of Glastonbury before he became bishop, but other sources disagree and do not give him that office. This traces to later medieval chroniclers, not to contemporary accounts. His brother was Heorstan, who held land near Glastonbury.

== Archbishopric ==
Between August 923 and September 925 he became archbishop. (Note: Janet Nelson states that he became archbishop in 923.) His translation from the see of Wells set a precedent for the future, and marks a break with historical practice. Previously, the moving of a bishop from one see to another had been held to be against canon, or ecclesiastical, law. Recently, however, the popes had themselves been translated, and this practice was to become common in England after Athelm's time. He was West Saxon, unlike his predecessor, Plegmund, who was Mercian, reflecting the shift in power to Wessex. Athelm was a paternal uncle of Dunstan, who later became Archbishop of Canterbury. It was Athelm who brought Dunstan to the king's court.

Athelm presided at the coronation of King Athelstan of England on 4 September 925, and probably composed or organised the new Ordo (order of service) in which, for the first time, the king wore a crown instead of a helmet. He also attested the king's first grant to St Augustine's Abbey in Canterbury. It is unclear if the reason that no coins were minted with his name was his short term of office or a change in policy towards the Archbishop of Canterbury minting coins in his own name. Nothing else is known of Athelm's brief time as archbishop.

== Death and burial ==
Athelm died on 8 January 926. He was later considered a saint, with a feast day of 8 January. He was buried at first in the church of St John the Baptist near the Saxon-era Canterbury Cathedral. When a new cathedral was constructed under Archbishop Lanfranc after the Norman Conquest of England, the earlier archbishops of Canterbury were moved to the north transept of the new cathedral. Later, Athelm and his successor as archbishop Wulfhelm were moved to a chapel dedicated to St Benedict, which later was incorporated into the Lady Chapel constructed by Prior Thomas Goldstone (d. 1468).

== Citations ==
Christian titles
New diocese	Bishop of Wells; 909–c. 923	Succeeded by Wulfhelm
Preceded by Plegmund	Archbishop of Canterbury c. 923–926	Succeeded by Wulfhelm
