= Ælfsige =

Archbishop of Canterbury from 958 to 959

- Archbishop of Canterbury
- Appointed: 958
- Term ended: 959
- Predecessor: Oda
- Successor: Byrhthelm
- Other post: Bishop of Winchester

Orders
- Consecration: 951

Personal details
- Died: 959 the Italian Alps

Ælfsige (or Aelfsige, Ælfsin or Aelfsin; died 959) was Bishop of Winchester before he became Archbishop of Canterbury in 959.

== Life ==
Ælfsige became Bishop of Winchester in 951. In 958, with the death of the previous Archbishop Oda, he was translated from the see of Winchester to become archbishop of Canterbury. He is said by Arthur Hussey to have trampled contemptuously on Oda's grave, "with reproaches for having so long kept himself out of that dignity".

Ælfsige died of cold in the Alps as he journeyed to Rome to be given his pallium by Pope John XII. In his place King Eadwig nominated Byrhthelm. Ælfsige's will survives and shows that he was married, with a son, Godwine of Worthy, who died in 1001 fighting against the Vikings.

== Citations ==
Christian titles
Preceded by Ælfheah I	Bishop of Winchester; 951–959	Succeeded by Beorhthelm of Winchester
Preceded by Oda the Severe	Archbishop of Canterbury; 958–959	Succeeded by Byrhthelm
