= Hodierna (disambiguation) =

Hodierna is a feminine given name and a family name.

Hodierna may also refer to:

- Giovanni Batista Hodierna, astronomer (1597–1660)
- Suecia Antiqua et Hodierna ("Ancient and Modern Sweden"), a work of engravings collected by Erik Dahlberg in the middle of the 17th century.
- Hodierna of Tripoli, countess of Tripoli
- Hodierna of St Albans, mother of Alexander Neckam and wet nurse to Richard I of England
- 21047 Hodierna
