= Christopher Willoughby =

Christopher Willoughby may refer to:

- Christopher Willoughby (MP) (by 1508–70), MP for Wilton and Wiltshire
- Christopher Willoughby-Drupe, Tintin character
- Christopher Willoughby, 10th Baron Willoughby de Eresby (1453 – 1498/1499)
- Sir Christopher Willoughby, 1st Baronet (1748–1808) of the Willoughby baronets
- Sir Christopher William Willoughby, 2nd Baronet (1793–1813) of the Willoughby baronets
- Christopher Willoughby, executive of the World Bank Group
- Chris Willoughby, pseudonym of Amy Witting
