= John Willoughby (1421–1477) =

English politician (1421–1477)

Sir John Willoughby (about 1421–1477), of Brook, de jure 8th Baron Latimer, was an English landowner, administrator, soldier and politician who was elected as MP for Wiltshire, where he lived, and for the adjoining seat of Somerset. He also served terms as High Sheriff for both counties.

== Origins ==
Born about 1421, he was the son of John Willoughby (about 1400–24 February 1436/7), de jure 7th Baron Latimer in 1430, a landowner in Lincolnshire, and his wife Jane or Joan Welby, daughter of John Welby. His paternal grandfather was Sir Thomas Willoughby, of Eresby (died 1417, Sheriff of Lincolnshire in 1403-4, son of Robert Willoughby, 4th Baron Willoughby de Eresby, and Margery La Zouche), who married his step-sister Elizabeth Neville, the sister of John Neville, 6th Baron Latimer, and the daughter of John Neville, 3rd Baron Neville, and Elizabeth Latimer, 5th Baroness Latimer.

== Career ==
By 1445 he had acquired Brook Hall at Westbury in Wiltshire through marriage to the heiress, and had made it his principal home, but retained lands in Lincolnshire where in that year he was appointed to a royal commission. In 1453 he was on the electoral roll for the county of Wiltshire, being appointed as its sheriff that year and as a justice of the peace. In 1456 he served as sheriff of Somerset and Dorset. As England sank into civil war, he supported the ruling Lancastrian party, being appointed in December 1459 to a commission of array raising troops and in March 1461 fighting on the losing side for King Henry VI at the Battle of Towton. After the victory of the Yorkist party, he rallied to the new king Edward IV, being pardoned and knighted. He sat again as MP for Wiltshire in 1467, being appointed to all royal commissions for the county, and served another term as its sheriff in 1472. In that year he was again elected as MP for Somerset. He died before 28 August 1477 and was succeeded by his eldest son Robert, aged 25.

== Family ==
Before 4 March 1445, he married Anne Cheyne (1426–1470), daughter and co-heiress of Sir Edmund Cheyne (1402–1430), of Brook, and his wife Alice Stafford (1405–1448), who in 1432 married again to the MP Sir Walter Tailboys (1391–1444). The other co-heiress, her sister Elizabeth Cheyne, married the MP Sir John Colshull.

With Anne he had seven known children:

- Robert Willoughby (1452–1502), later an MP and created 1st Baron Willoughby de Broke, who married Blanche Champernowne.
- Sir William Willoughby of Turners Puddle (1455–1513), later an MP and a knight, illegitimate father of Christopher Willoughby, also an MP.
- Richard Willoughby (died 1523), who married Isabel Bedyke.
- Edward Willoughby (died 1508), who entered the church, becoming Archdeacon of Stafford and Dean of Exeter.
- Cecily Willoughby (died 1528), who entered the church, becoming Abbess of Wilton Abbey.
- Elizabeth Willoughby, who married William Carrant.

A relative and likely descendant of his was Robert then Roberto Willoughby (Knoyle, Wiltshire, c. 1570 - Funchal, 1653), pioneer English merchant who arrived in Funchal as a young man with his wife Antonia Cobham about 1590 or shortly after 1600, a staunch Catholic, and much in favour in Lisbon and Madrid, who became a Knight of the Order of Christ in Portugal and was buried at the Franciscan convent in Funchal, and had issue there, of which some came from the Madeira Island to the village of Almada. Among that issue is the wife of the 1st Viscount of Juromenha. It seems that, presently, this surname is not used and is extinct in male line in Portugal, although there are still members of the family, surname some have corrupted into Velouvy or Velouvi. It seems that they brought to Portugal the following arms, which correspond to a series of many surnames and are similar to the ones of the Barons Willoughby de Broke, which include Willoughby and Latimer in the first two quarters respectively: quartered, the first counterquartered, the first and the fourth sable, a cross canneled argent, the second and the third gules, an anchored cross argent, the second gules, a cross flory argent, the third gules, four rhombuses argent aligned and pointed fess, each rhombus charged with a scalop gules, the fourth or, arched band argent shaped sable, and dented bordure sable; crest: an old man's head carnation, crowned or.
