= St Augustine's Conduit House =

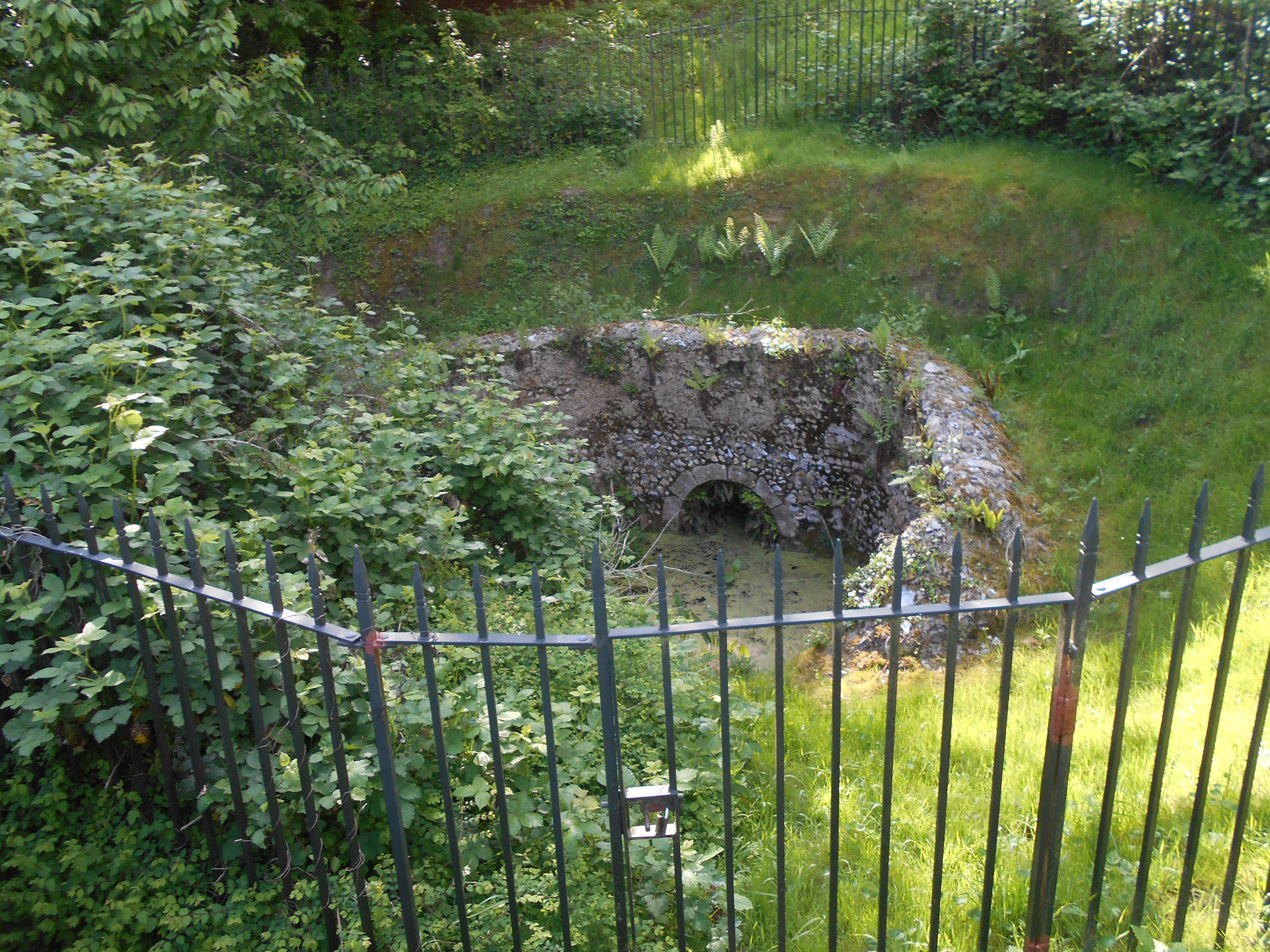

- Location within Kent
- 51°16′50.520″N 1°5′41.964″E
- Location: King's Park, Canterbury
- OS grid reference: TR 159 580

History
- Built: 12th century

Site notes
- Website: www.english-heritage.org.uk/visit/places/conduit-house/

Scheduled monument
- Designated: 30 October 1972
- Reference no.: 1014577

St Augustine's Conduit House is an archaeological site in Canterbury, Kent, England, a medieval conduit house built to serve St Augustine's Abbey a short distance away. It is an English Heritage site, and a scheduled monument.

== Description ==
The practice of supplying water to a monastic community via a conduit house, where local rivers and streams might be polluted, was common in the medieval period.

This conduit house, to supply water to St Augustine's Abbey, was built in the mid 12th century, on a west facing hillside. Springs near the building were tapped; four tunnels, fed by several smaller ducts, brought water into the collecting tank. It is roughly octagonal, about 7 metres (23 ft) north-east to south-west by 4.75 metres (15.6 ft), with an earth bed, and walls surviving to about 3 metres (9.8 ft) high.

Water was piped to the abbey.through a lead pipe of diameter 3 inches, leading downhill from the western side of the tank. At the abbey there may have been a water tower, feeding smaller tanks in the various parts of the community.

In 1733 Sir John Hales, owner of the reservoir, allowed Canterbury to use it to supplement its water supply, and it is thought that he made the modifications in which the tank was divided and a new roof, consisting of two shallow barrel vaults, was built. There were further repairs and refurbishment, including rebuilding the roof, in the 19th century.

The roof of the conduit house collapsed in February 1988; there was partial excavation later that year by the Canterbury Archaeological Trust, which established some details of the building's construction.
