= Alexander le Pargiter =

English monk (??–c.1220)

Alexander of St Albans (died circa 1220), said to have been known by the surnames of Cementarius or le Pargiter (the Plasterer), was an English ecclesiastic of the thirteenth century. He was first a Benedictine monk of the monastery of St. Augustine, at Canterbury, of which house he was made abbot in 1213. He was distinguished by his steady adherence to King John, who sent him in Rome to protest Pope Innocent III. He was excommunicated by Legate Pandulph after the death of the king, and he was deprived of his clerical station. He died in great poverty about the year 1220, though some place his death in 1217. (Note: Date likely confused with the death of Alexander Neckam.) He wrote several works, which are enumerated by Tanner.

Alexander may be confused with Alexander Neckam, also called Alexander of St Albans. Both were abbots and writers operating at the same time.
