= St Augustine's Abbey =

Benedictine monastery in Kent, England

UNESCO World Heritage Site
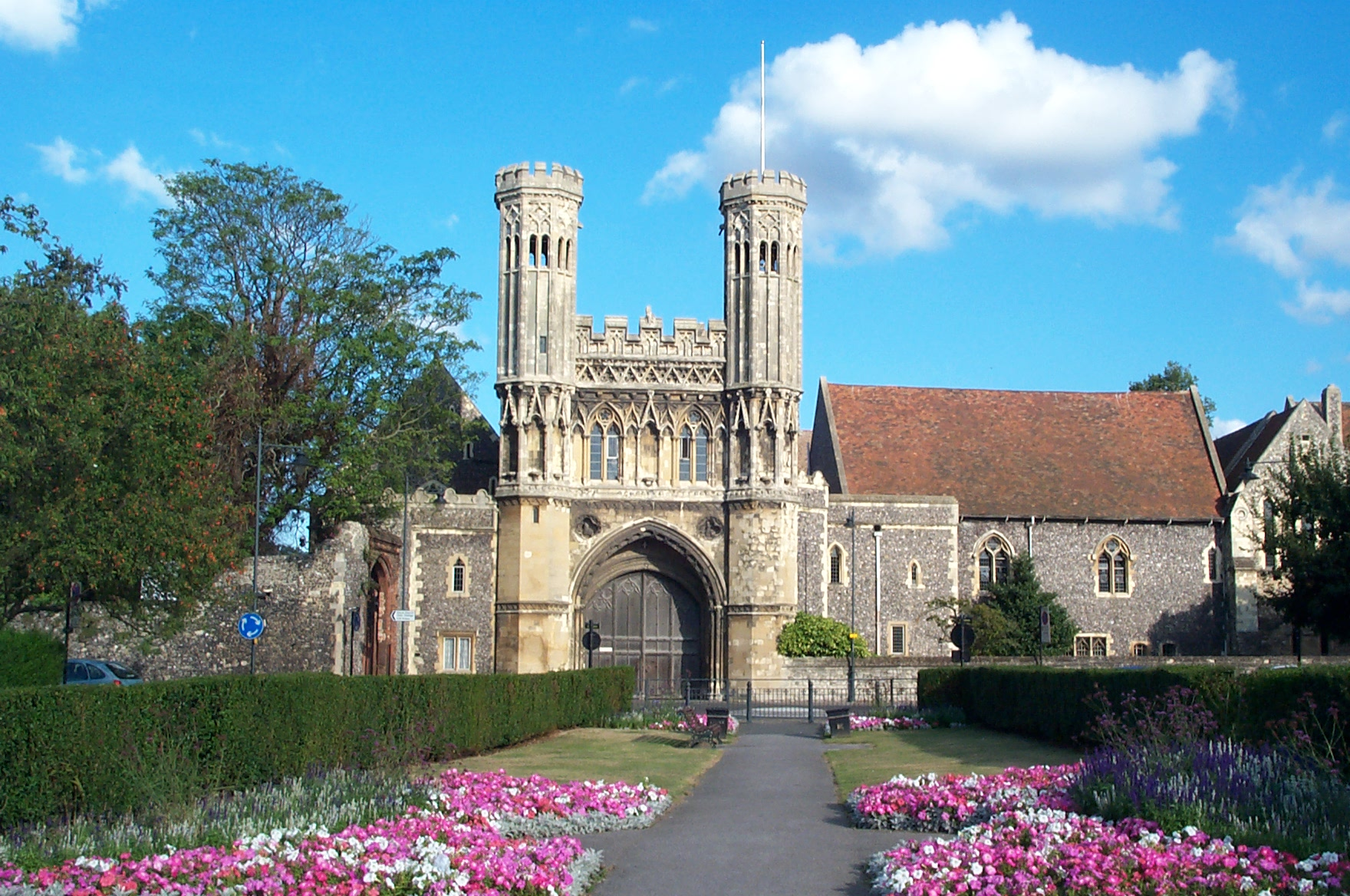
- Abbot Fyndon's Great Gate, with Lady Wootton's Green in the foreground, is a private entrance into the King’s School. The public entrance to the abbey ruins is on Longport.

- Location within Kent Location within the United Kingdom
- Location: Canterbury, Kent, United Kingdom
- Part of: Canterbury Cathedral, St Augustine's Abbey, and St Martin's Church
- Reference: 496-002
- Inscription: 1988 (12th Session)
- Area: 8.42 ha (20.8 acres)
- Website: english-heritage.org.uk/visit/places/st-augustines-abbey/
- Coordinates: 51°16′44.0″N 1°5′13.5″E

St Augustine's Abbey (founded as the Monastery of Ss Peter and Paul and changed after its founder St Augustine of Canterbury's death) was a Benedictine monastery in Canterbury, Kent, England. The abbey was founded in 598 and functioned as a monastery until its dissolution in 1538 during the English Reformation. After the abbey's dissolution, it underwent dismantlement until 1848.

Since 1848, part of the site has been used for educational purposes (used as boarding houses and a library by The King's School, Canterbury) and the abbey ruins have been preserved for their historical value.

== From founding until dissolution ==
In 597, Augustine arrived in England, having been sent by Pope Gregory I to convert the Anglo-Saxons. The king of Kent at this time was Æthelberht (or Ethelbert). Although he worshipped in a pagan temple just outside the walls of Canterbury to the east of the city, Ethelbert was married to a Christian, Bertha. According to tradition, the king not only gave his temple and its precincts to St Augustine for a church and monastery, he also ordered that the church to be erected be of "becoming splendour, dedicated to the blessed apostles Peter and Paul, and endowed it with a variety of gifts." One purpose of the foundation was to provide a residence for Augustine and his brother monks. As another, both King Ethelbert and Augustine foresaw the abbey as a burial place for abbots, archbishops, and kings of Kent.

William Thorne, the 14th-century chronicler of the abbey, records 598 as the year of the foundation. The monastic buildings were most likely wooden in the manner of Saxon construction, so they could be quickly built. However, building a church of solid masonry, like the churches Augustine had known in Rome, took longer. The church was completed and consecrated in 613. Ca. 624 a short distance to the east, Eadbald, son and successor of Ethelbert, founded a second church, dedicated to Saint Mary which also buried Kentish royalty. The abbey became known as St Augustine's after the founder's death.

For two centuries after its founding, St Augustine's was the only important religious house in the kingdom of Kent. The historian G. F. Maclear characterized St Augustine's as being a "missionary school" where "classical knowledge and English learning flourished". Over time, St Augustine's Abbey acquired an extensive library that included both religious and secular holdings. In addition, it had a scriptorium for producing manuscripts.

=== Dunstan's reform ===
Dunstan, Archbishop of Canterbury from 959 to 988, influenced a reorganisation of the abbey to conform to Benedictine rule. Buildings were enlarged and the church rebuilt. Dunstan also revised the dedication of the abbey, from the original Saints Peter and Paul, by adding Saint Augustine in 978. Since then, the abbey has been known as St Augustine's.

=== Invading Danes ===
The invading Danes not only spared St Augustine's, but in 1027 King Cnut made over all the possessions of Minster-in-Thanet to St Augustine's. These possessions included the preserved body of Mildrith (St Mildred). Belief in the miraculous power of this relic had spread throughout Europe, and it brought many pilgrims to St Augustine's, whose gifts enriched the abbey.

=== Norman conquest ===
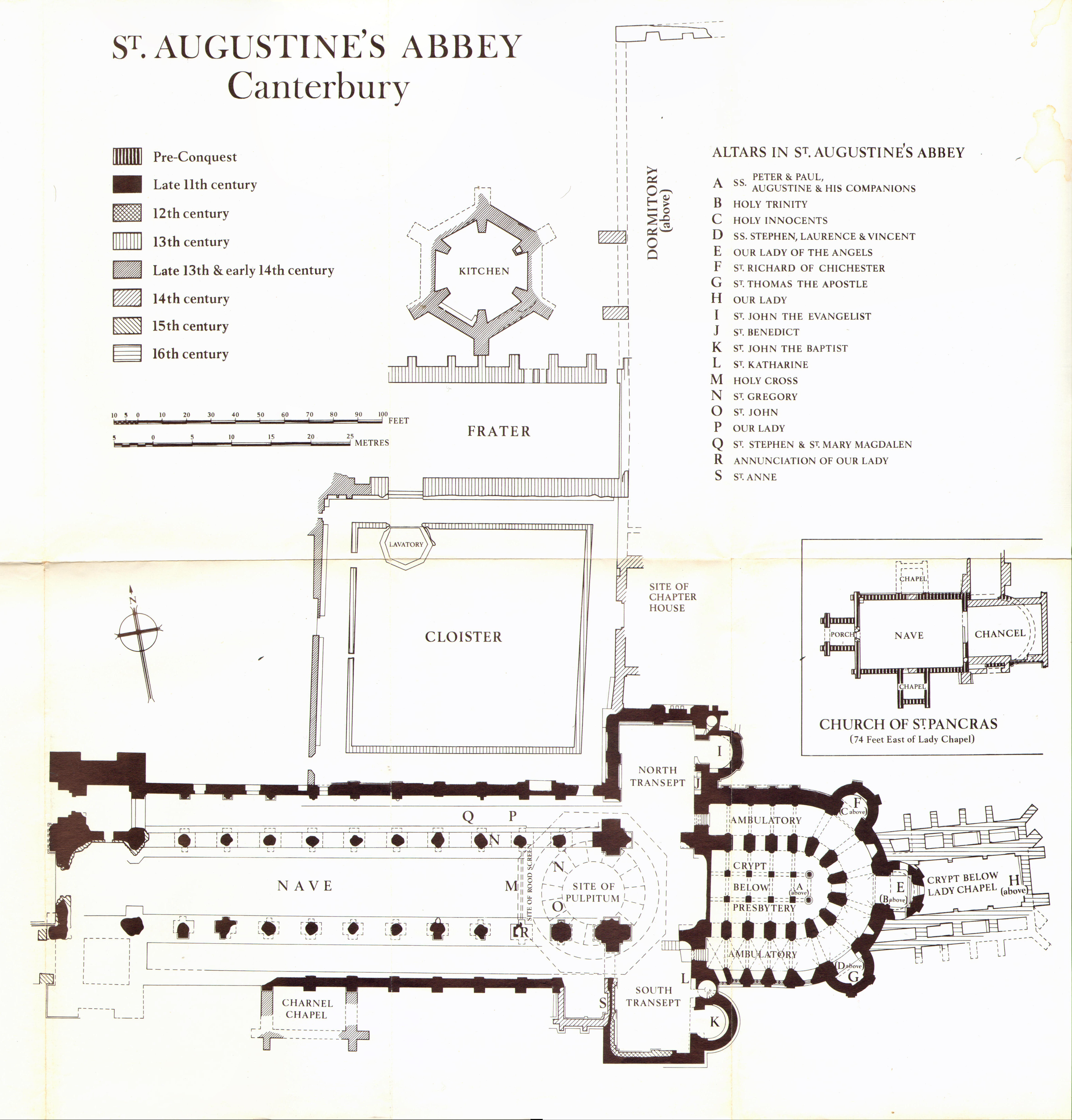
Plan of the Abbey showing the different building periods

Following the Norman Conquest of England in 1066, William the Conqueror confiscated landed estates, but he respected Church property. At St Augustine's Abbey, the Anglo-Saxon buildings were completely reconstructed in the form of a typical Norman Benedictine monastery. By 1100, all the original buildings had disappeared under a Romanesque edifice. There was further rebuilding as a result of the great fire in 1168. The fire's destruction accounts for the paucity of historical records for the preceding period.

From about 1250 onwards was a period of wealth in which "building succeeded building". Boggis's history calls this period a time of "worldly magnificence", marked by "lavish expenditures" on new buildings, royal visits, and banquets with thousands of guests. In addition, the papacy imposed many levies on the abbey. The large debt that was incurred by these expenditures might have swamped the abbey had it not been for generous benefactors who came to the rescue.

The cloister, frater (refectory) and kitchen were totally rebuilt. A new abbot's lodging and a great hall were added. In the early 14th century, land was acquired for a cellarer's range (living and working quarters for the cellarer who was responsible for provisioning the abbey's cellarium), a brewhouse, a bakehouse, and a new walled vineyard. A Lady chapel was built to the east of the church.

==== Fyndon’s Gate ====
The abbey gatehouse was rebuilt from 1301 to 1309 by Abbot Fyndon. It has since been known as the Fyndon Gate or the Great Gate. The chamber above the entrance was the state bed-chamber of the monastery. In 1625, Charles I of England and Queen Henrietta Maria slept in this chamber, following their marriage in Canterbury Cathedral. In 1660, after the Restoration, Charles II and his brothers, the Dukes of York and Gloucester, stayed in the gatehouse on their way to London.

Fyndon's gate suffered such damage by German bombs during the Second World War that it had to be rebuilt. The gate faces a small square known since the reign of Charles I as Lady Wootton's Green, after the widow of Edward, Lord Wootton of Marley who lived in the palace until her death in 1658. Statues of Æthelberht of Kent and Queen Bertha stand on the green.

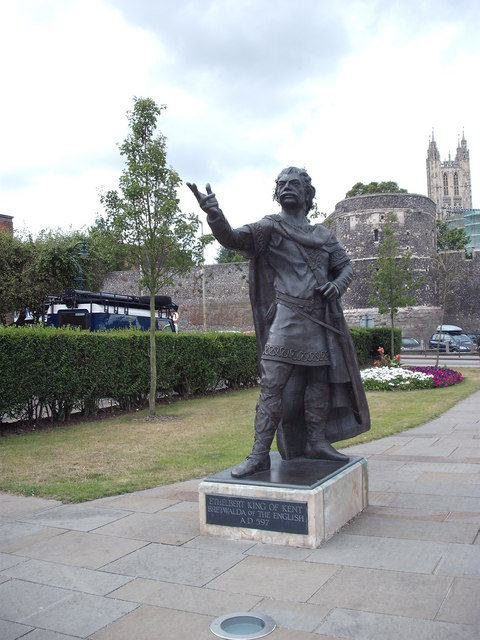
King Æthelbert's statue

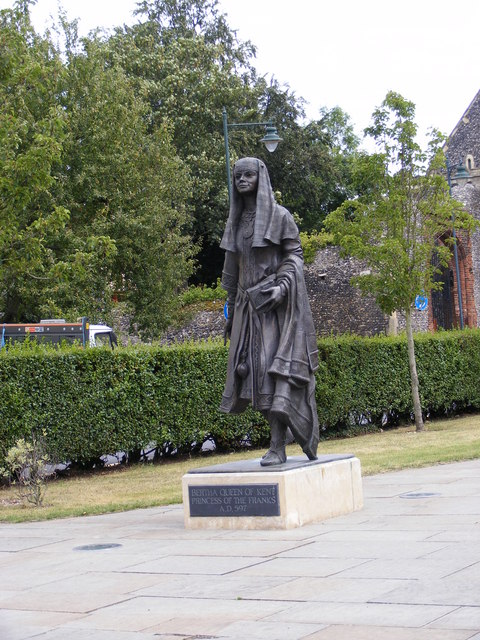
Queen Bertha's statue

==== St Anne's Chapel ====
In the 1360s, Juliana Leybourne funded the building of the "Countess's Chapel" or more usually "St Anne's Chapel" that was built on the side of the abbey. This was a small square chapel that had its own buttresses. Within the chapel was the tomb of the Abbot of Bourne who died in 1334 and the Abbot of Colwel who died in 1375. Leybourne was buried in the chapel. She gave the manor of Dene in Thanet to the abbey and a chantry to say daily prayers for her after her death.

== Dissolution to present ==
Boggis describes the early 16th century leading up to the Dissolution of the Monasteries as "days of decadence". Although the abbey owned estates throughout Kent amounting to 19,862 acres, Boggis holds that "historical evidence proves conclusively that even if Henry VIII had never dissolved them, the English monasteries were already doomed." The "extortionate exactions" of the Papacy would lead to bankruptcy.

However, the English Reformation accompanied by the Dissolution of the Monasteries happened before bankruptcy. The Reformation replaced the Pope (a cleric) with a monarch (a layman). Actions by the Parliament's House of Commons strengthened the power of the laity versus the power of the clergy. These actions were part of the English Reformation's "great transfer" of power, both economic and religious, from ecclesiastical to secular authorities.

As part of the "great transfer", Parliament gave King Henry VIII authority to dissolve the monasteries and confiscate the property for the Crown. The rationale given was "that the religious houses had ceased to apply their property to the specific religious uses for which it was originally given."

On 30 July 1538, the King's Commissioners arrived to take the surrender of St Augustine's Abbey. The last abbot and monks complied and left the abbey. The abbey, with its site, its goods, buildings, lands and all other possessions, became the property of the Crown. This dissolution ended over 940 years of monastic presence.

=== Dismantling ===
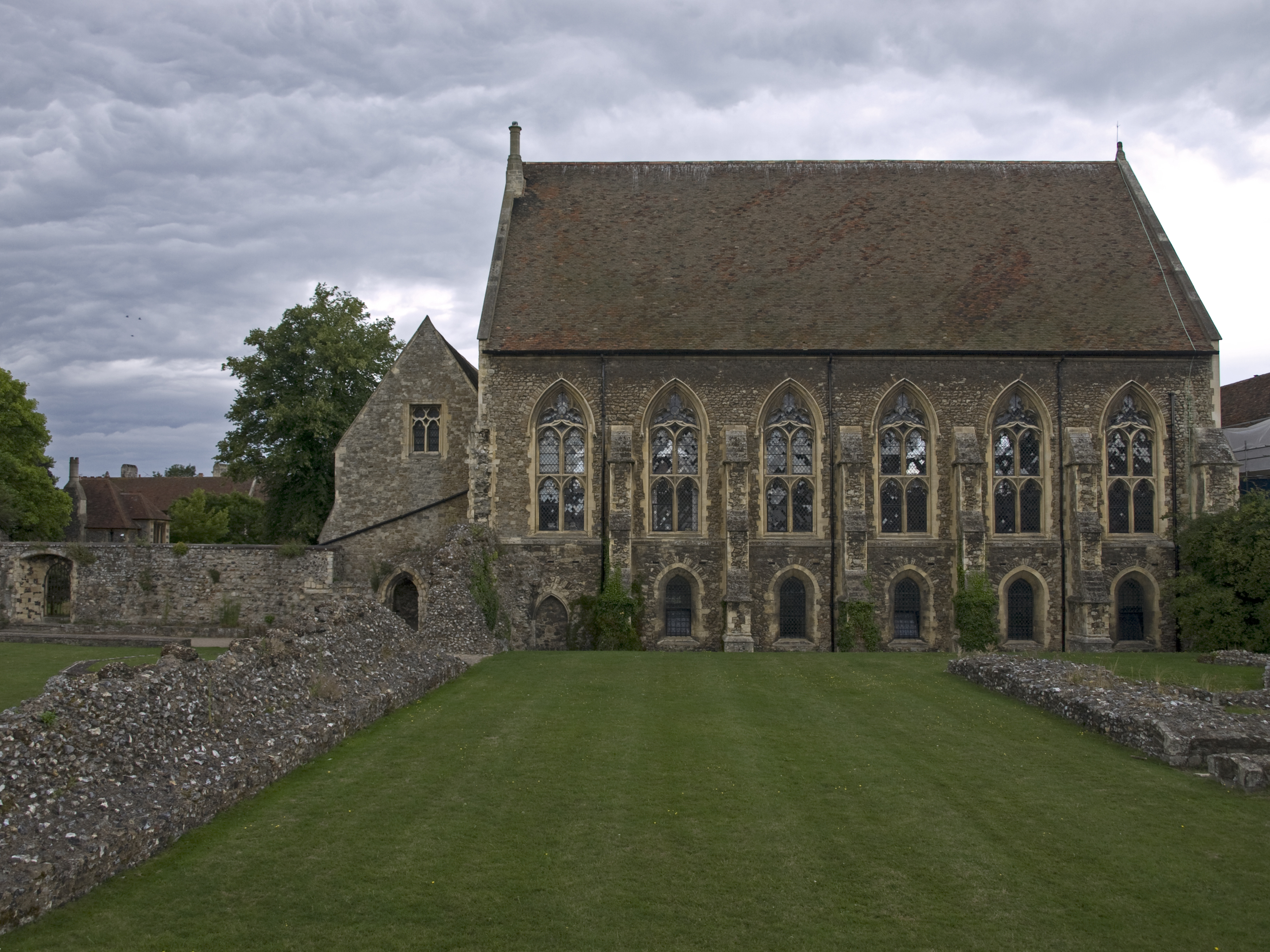
St Augustine's College chapel

During the rest of Henry's reign, St Augustine's Abbey was held by the Crown with some of its buildings converted into a royal residence. However, in other parts of the abbey dismantling and sale of material began in 1541. Some of the stone was used in the fortifications of the Pale of Calais, but more of it was sold locally. The library, containing two thousand manuscripts, was destroyed and the treasure plundered.

The royal residence was occasionally used by the monarch as late as the reign of Queen Elizabeth I, during which the buildings were leased to a succession of noblemen. In 1564, Elizabeth leased the palace to Lord Cobham, and in September 1573 she visited Canterbury and lodged at her palace of St Augustine's. On 7 September, her birthday, she attended a ball at the Archbishop's palace, returning at midnight to St Augustine's. Lord Cobham was a resident of Kent who had served her faithfully as a diplomat and parliamentarian. On the attainder of Lord Cobham for treason in 1603 under the reign of James I, the residence was granted to Robert Cecil, Lord Essenden.

After Cecil died in 1612, James I and VI leased the palace to Edward, Lord Wootton of Marley (sometimes spelled "Wotton"), for a yearly rent of £20 13s and 4d. Wootton employed John Tradescant the Elder to lay out formal gardens. In 1618, King James granted a power for seven years to search for "treasure-trove, plate, jewels, copes, vestments, books, and the like, hid, or supposed to be hid, in abbeys, priories, monasteries, churches, chapels, and other places within the realm." As a result, the Abbey was searched and some of the land around it was dug.

Wootton died in 1626, but Lady Wootton lived on in the palace until her death in 1658. The open space before the gateway is still known as Lady Wootton's Green.

Sir Edward Hales (1626–1684) took possession of the property after Lady Wootton's death, to be followed by his son Sir Edward Hales (1645–1695). Rather than conserving the property, these new owners dismantled the buildings and carried used stones to build a new house at Hales Place.

From then on until 1844, the desolation continued until it had engulfed the church, cloister, kitchen, and refectory. Other parts of the site suffered degradation. From 1770 to 1844, the Alfred Beer & Company brewery operated within the abbey precincts. In 1804, a portion of the site was divided into lots and sold. The Great Court was used as a bowling green and skittle ground. Ethelbert's Tower, the remaining tower of the Norman abbey, was taken down in 1822. Robert Ewell, in his Guide to St. Augustine’s Monastery and Missionary College wrote that in the first half of the 19th century, the abbey "reached its lowest point of degradation".

=== Restoration to present ===
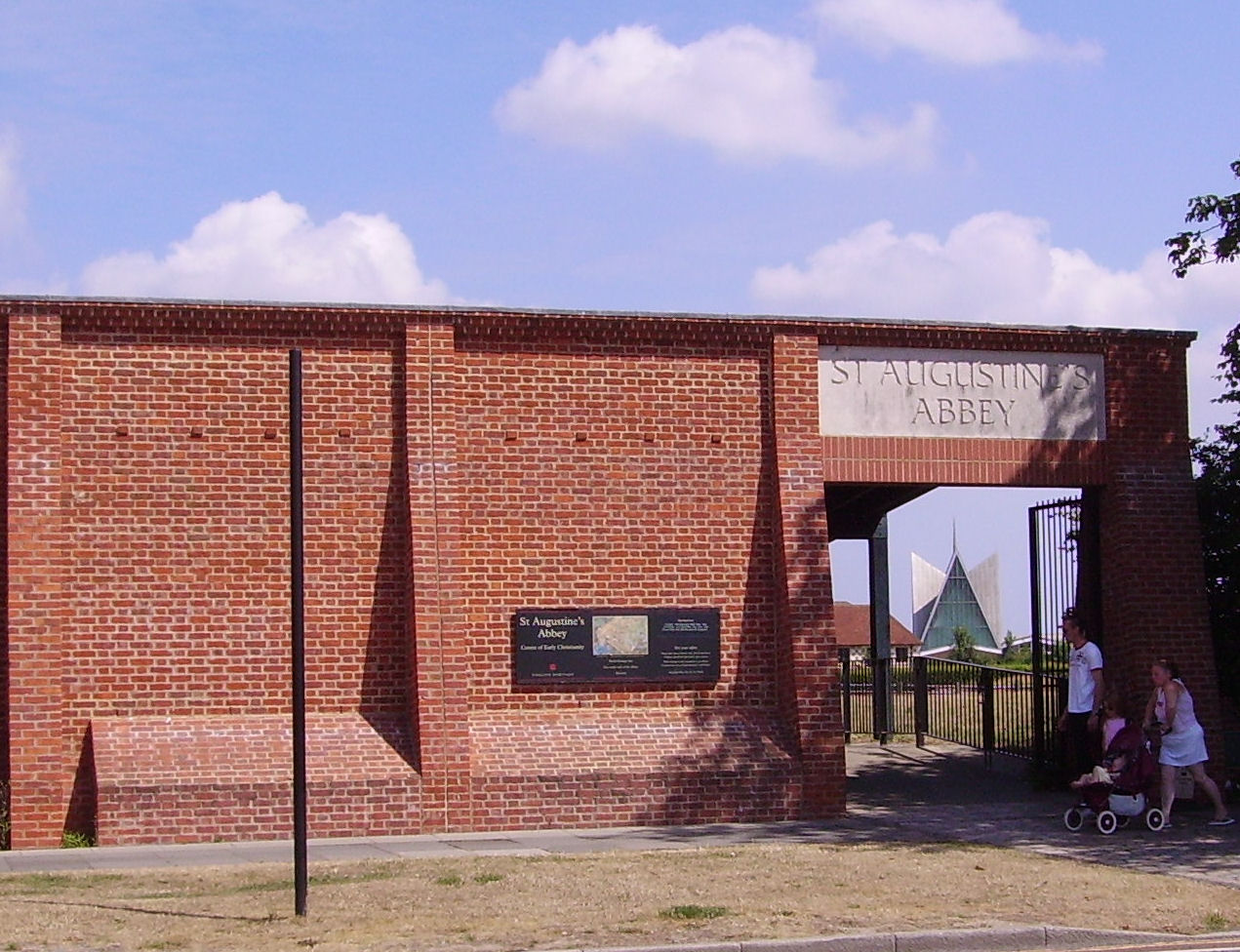
English Heritage entrance on Longport to St Augustine's Abbey ruins

The condition of the abbey did not go unnoticed. In 1844 a rich young landowner, member of parliament, and generous churchman, Alexander James Beresford Hope, visited the ruins, found them deplorable, and bought them. Inspired by the missionary zeal of the Reverend Edward Coleridge, Hope and other donors gave additional money to restore and construct buildings for the establishment of a college to train young men as missionaries in the British colonies. They envisioned a dual purpose for the college: (a) to educate missionaries and (b) to excavate and preserve the abbey remains. St Augustine's Missionary College remained in existence until 1947. However, on the night of 31 May 1942, its buildings were so badly damaged by a German Blitz raid that the college ceased operations.

From 1952 to 1967, the Missionary College buildings were used as the Central College of the Anglican Communion.

From 1969 to 1976, the college buildings were used by the theological department of King's College London as a base for final year ordination preparation.

Since 1976, the college buildings, together with some new ones, have been used by the King's School, Canterbury, for boarding houses and the school library. This part of the St Augustine's Abbey site was at first leased and then in 1994 bought by the school.

In 1940 the ruins of the abbey were taken into the care of the British government and are now managed by English Heritage. The Abbey is part of a UNESCO World Heritage Site with Canterbury Cathedral and St Martin's Church.

== Ruins extant ==
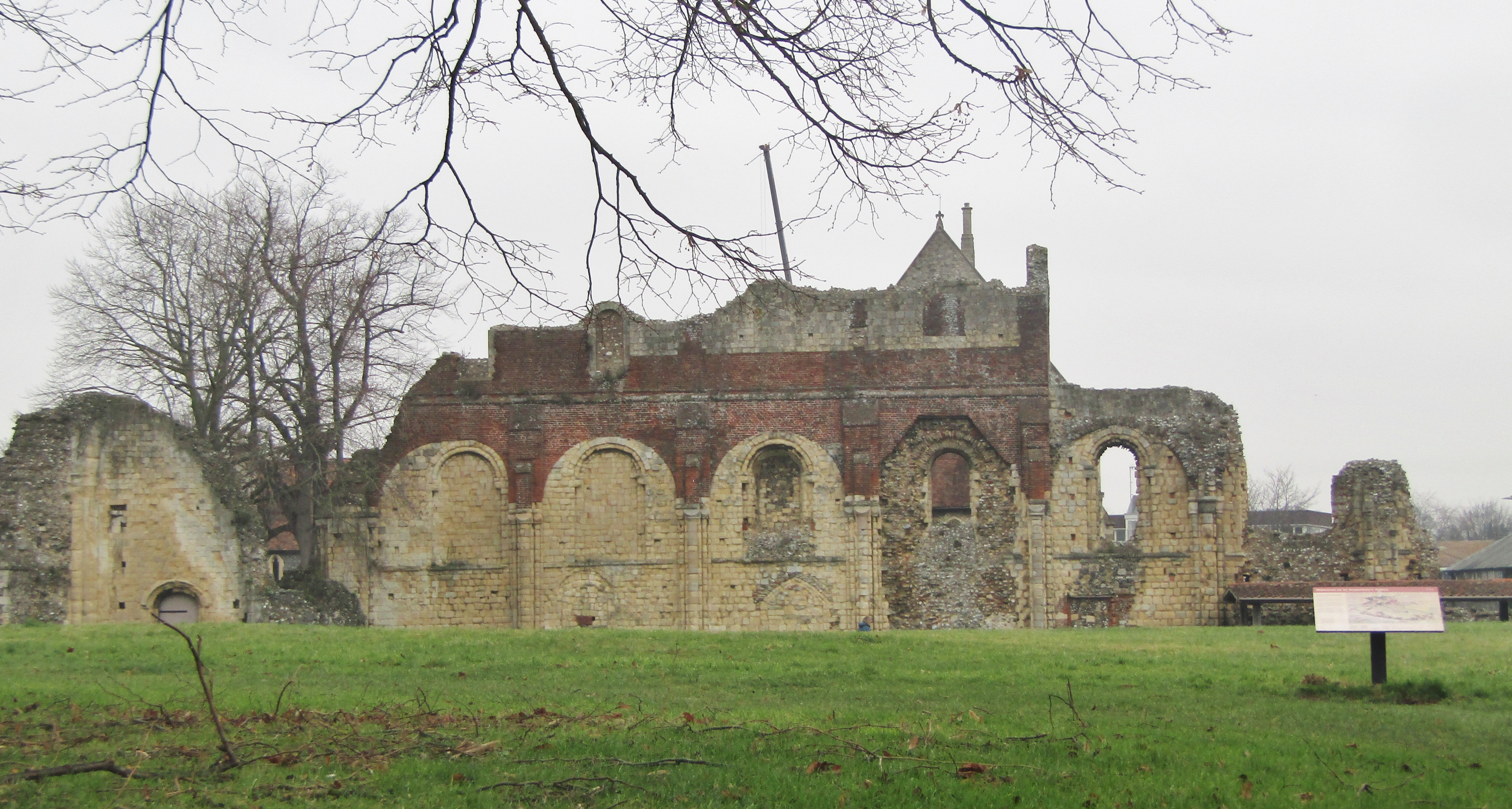
Ruins of the abbey church at St Augustine's Abbey

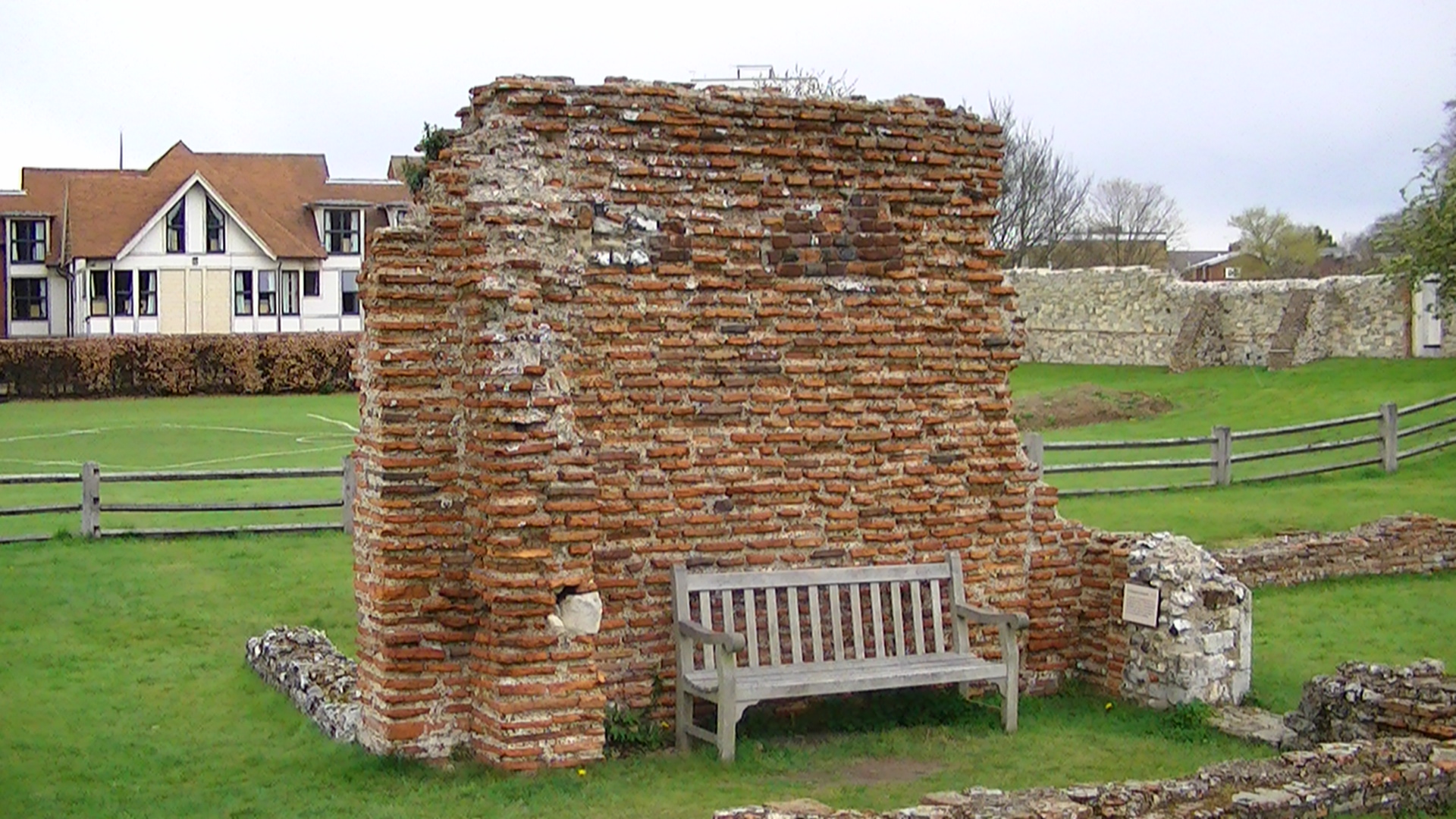
Ruins of the Anglo-Saxon St Pancras Church, on the grounds of St Augustine's

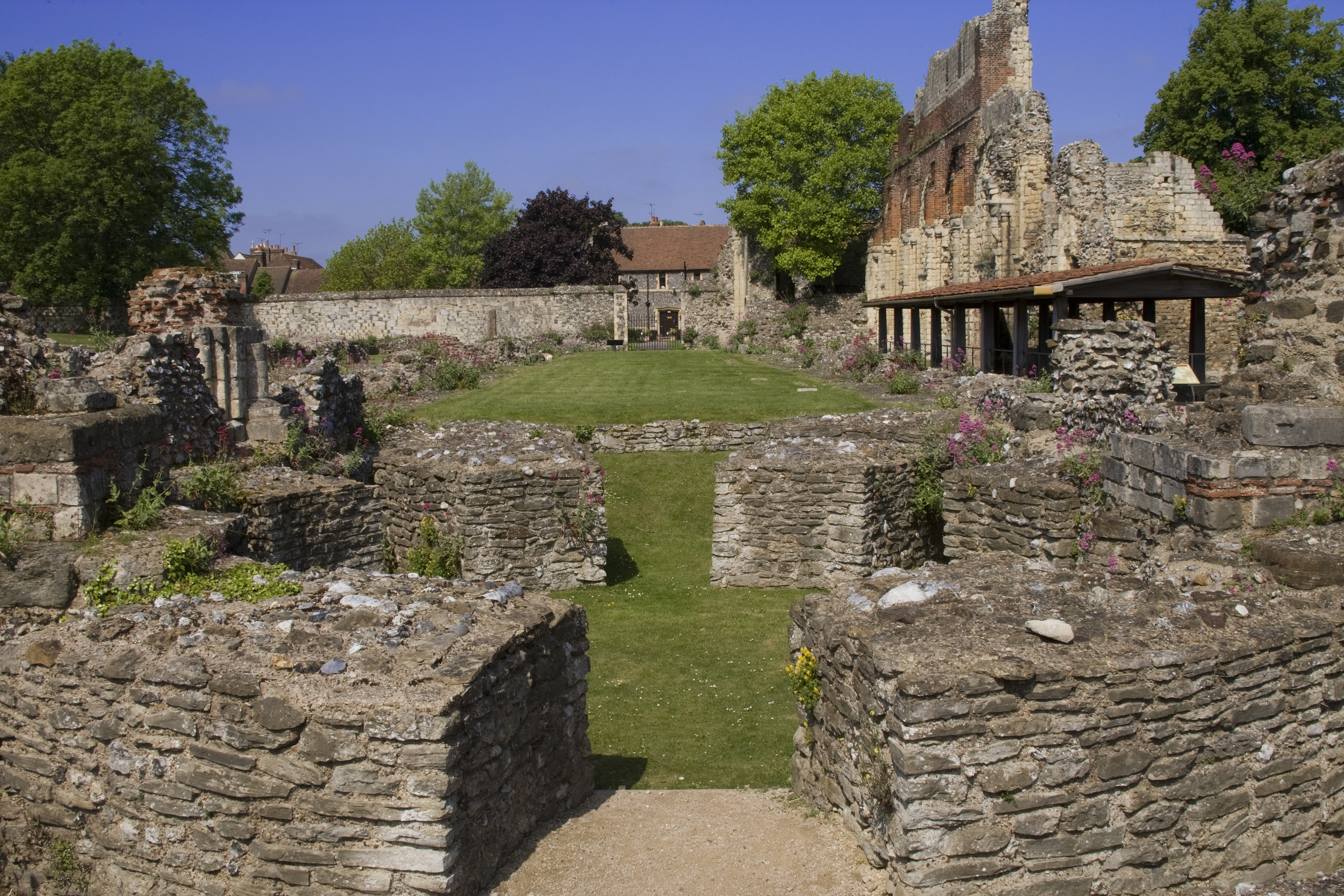
Ruins of the rotunda and nave of the Church of Ss Peter and Paul, on the grounds of St Augustine's

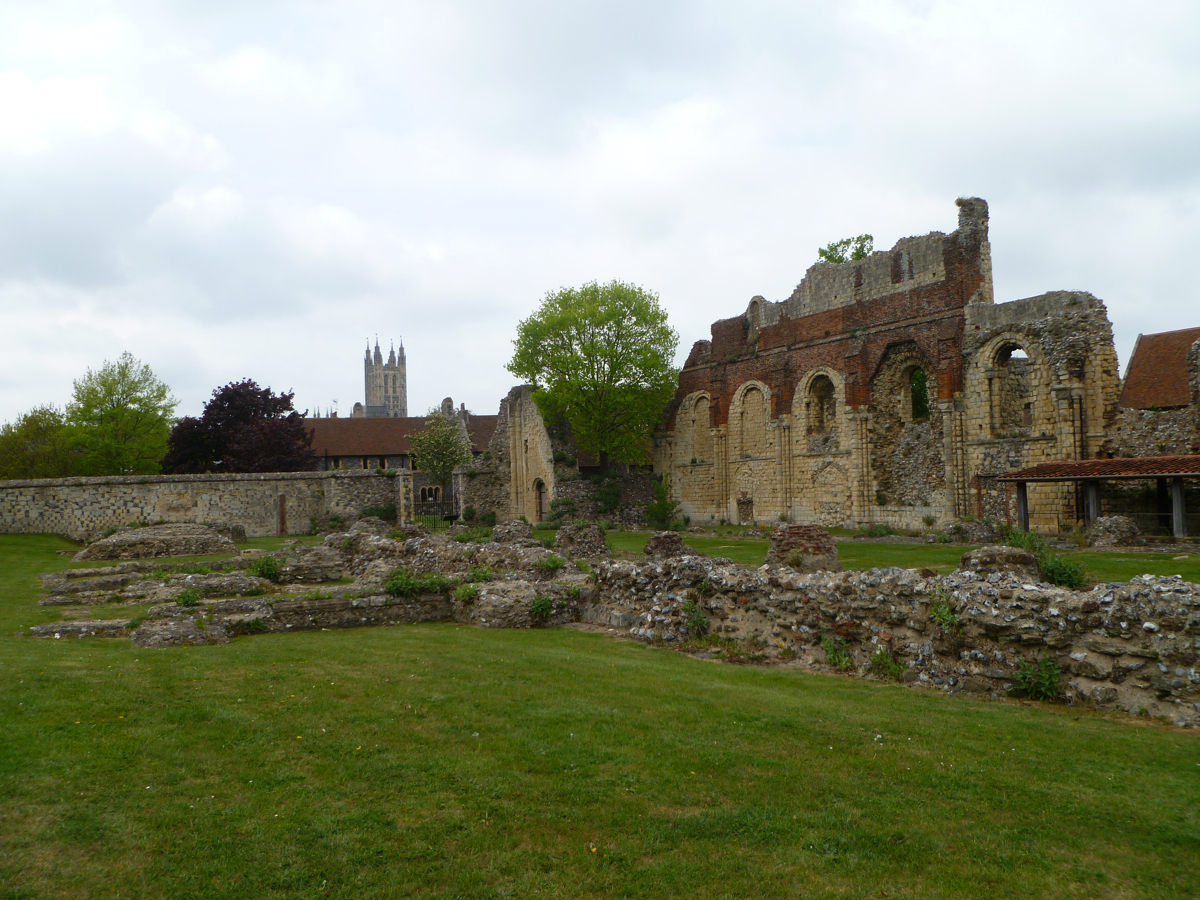
View of Canterbury Cathedral from the ruin grounds of St Augustine's

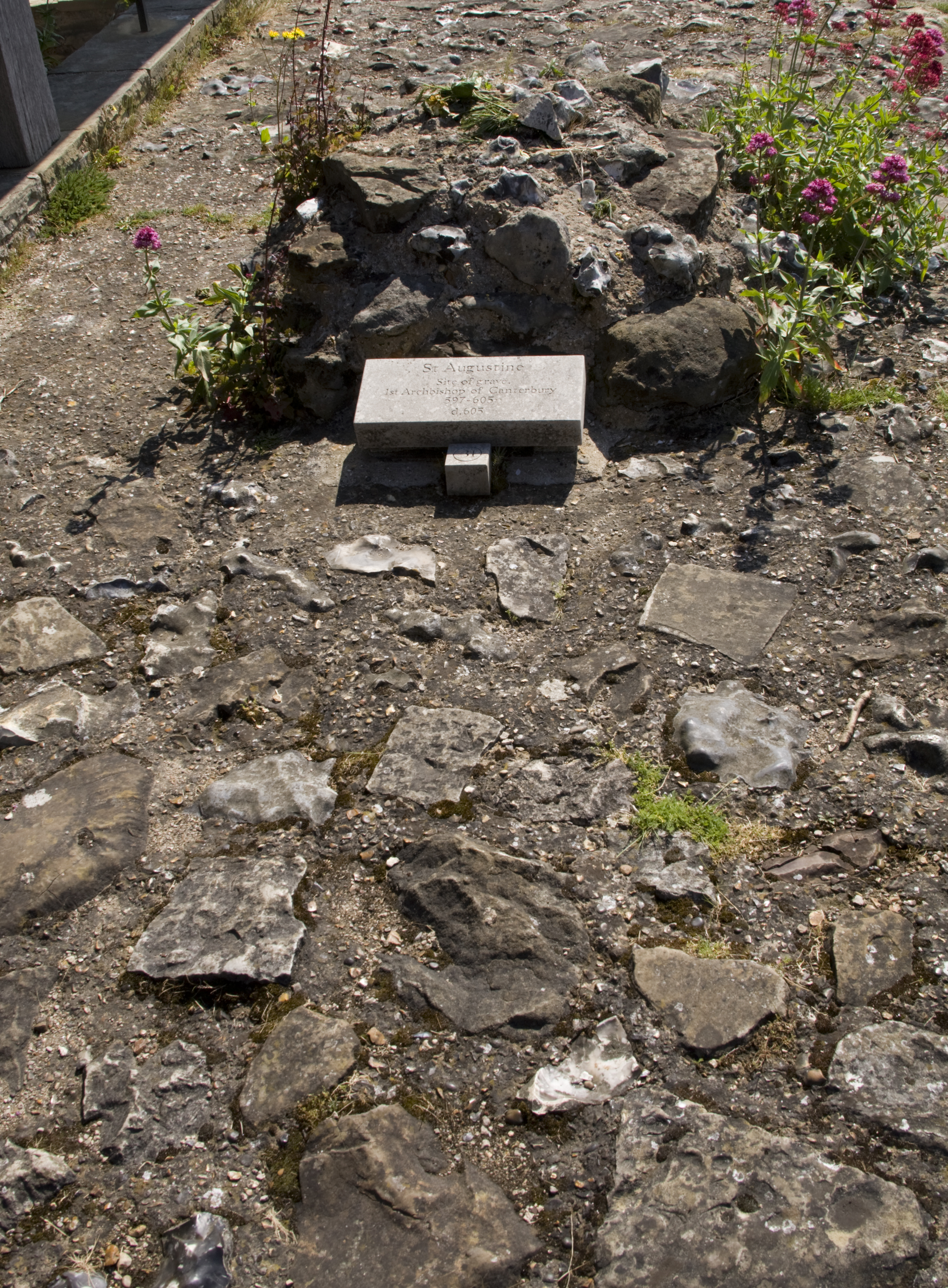
Gravesite of Augustine of Canterbury

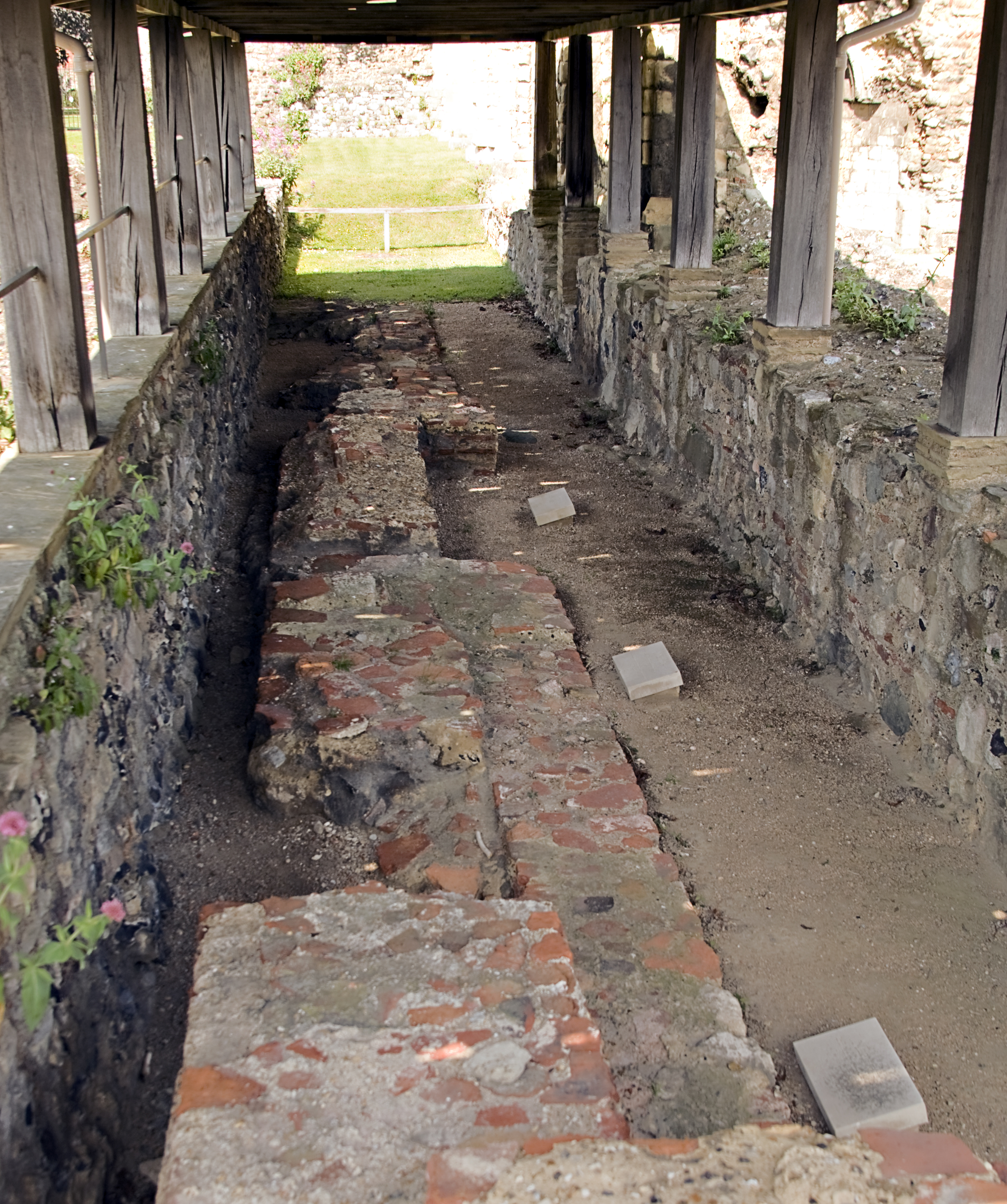
Gravesites of Mellitus, Justus and Laurence, early Archbishops of Canterbury

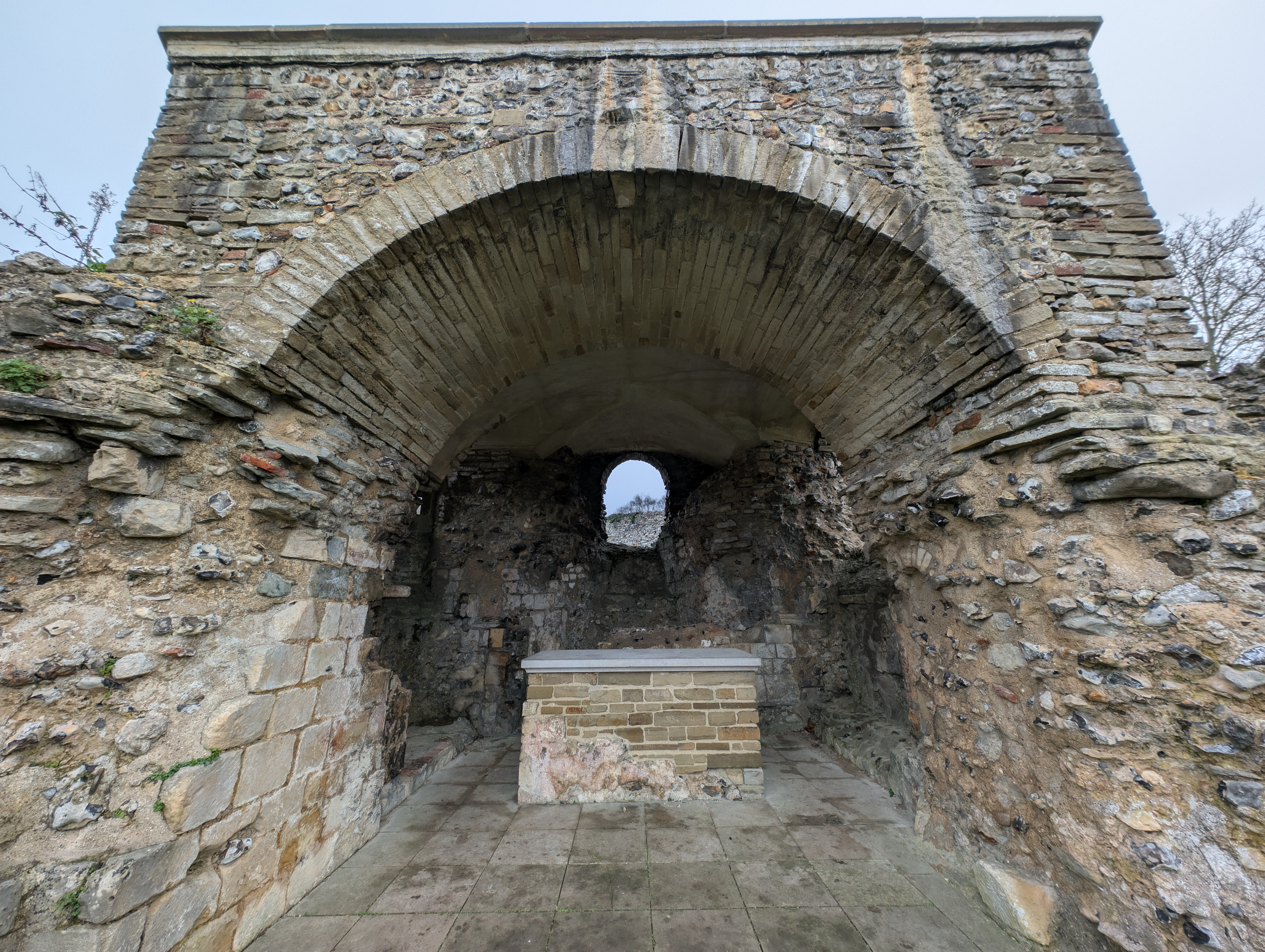
The Chapel of the Blessed Virgin Mary in St Augustine's Abbey

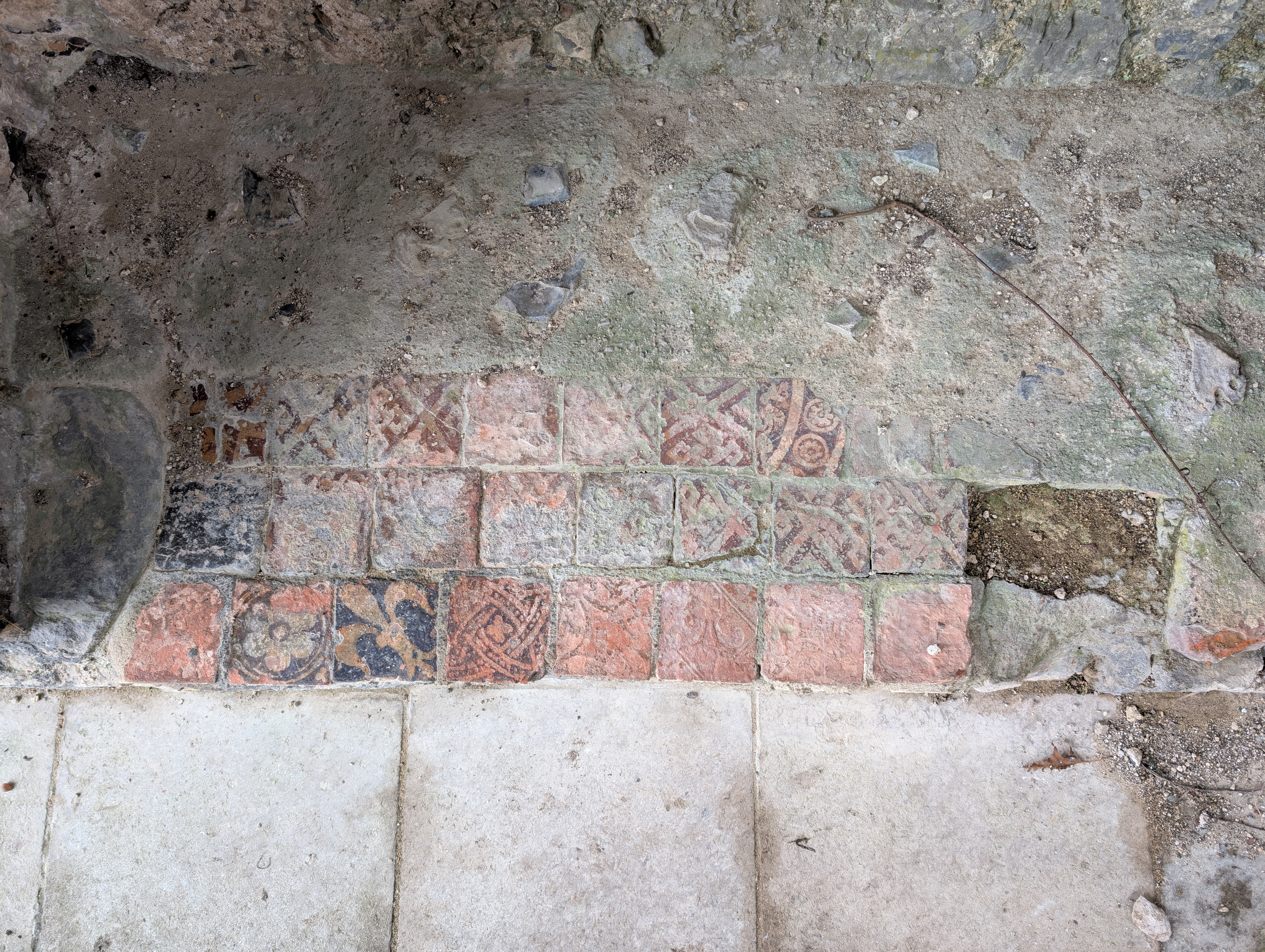
Surviving floor tiles from elsewhere in the church, relaid on the floor of the Chapel of the Blessed Virgin Mary.

=== Notable burials at the abbey ===
- Æthelberht of Kent, King of Kent, in the Church of St Peter and St Paul. His shrine was later placed above the high altar of the Norman church
- Eadbald of Kent, King of Kent, in the Church of St Peter and St Paul
- Theodore of Tarsus, Archbishop of Canterbury
- Emma of Austrasia, consort of Eadbald, also in the Church of St Peter and St Paul
- Justus, first Bishop of Rochester, fourth Archbishop of Canterbury
- Juliana Leybourne, Countess of Huntingdon, landowner and benefactor
- Mellitus, saint, third Archbishop of Canterbury and the first Bishop of London

== List of abbots ==
=== Anglo-Saxon period ===
The main sources for Anglo-Saxon abbots of St Augustine's are the later medieval histories of the abbey, but their information is dubious and in some cases fictional. The historian Susan Kelly provides a list from the abbey's foundation to its dissolution in 1538.

==== Early abbots ====
- Peter (probably died 614)
- John (traditional dates 607-618)
- Ruffinianus (traditional dates 618-626)
- Graciosus (traditional dates 626-638)
- Petronius (traditional dates 638-654)
- Nathanael (traditional dates 654-667)
- Vacancy (667-669)
- Benedict Biscop (c.669-670)
- Hadrian (669 or 670 to 709 or 710)
- Albinus (appointed 709 or 710, traditional date of death 732)
- Northbalbaldus (traditional dates 732-748)
- Aldhun (traditional dates 748-760, but probably remained abbot until at least 762)
- Jænberht (probably 762-764)
- Æthelnoth (probably appointed 764, traditional date of death 787)
- Guthheard (traditional dates 787-803)
- Cunred (traditional dates 803-822)
- Wernoth (traditional dates 822-844, but may have been appointed in or before 805 and still seems to have been abbot in 838)
- Dryhtnoth (traditional dates 844-864)
- Wynhere (traditional dates 864-866, but mentioned in two charters of 845 and so may have preceded Dryhtnoth)

==== The century of uncertainty ====
After Wynhere there is a period which Kelly calls the "century of uncertainty", in which the names given by later historians of the abbey are dubious or even fictional. It is unlikely that all the fifteen men listed below were abbots and possible that none were:

- Beahmund (866-874)
- Cyneberht (874-879)
- Etans (879-883)
- Dægmund (883-886)
- Alfred (886-894)
- Ceolberht (894-902)
- Beccanus (902-907)
- Æthelwold (907-910)
- Tilberht (910-917)
- Eadred (I) (917-920)
- Alhmund (920-928)
- Guttulf (928-935)
- Eadred (II) (935-937)
- Lulling (937-939)
- Beornhelm (939-942)

==== Later Anglo-Saxon abbots ====
Independent evidence from witness lists to charters is available for the late Anglo-Saxon period, and this shows that the lists of the abbey historians are very inaccurate for the tenth century, and slightly inaccurate for the eleventh century.

- Wigstan (not mentioned by historians but witnesses in 946 as abbot of St Augustine's)
- Eadhelm (not mentioned by historians but apparently abbot from c.949 to c. 958)
- Ælfric (abbot from c. 959, traditional date of death 971)
- Æthelnoth (traditional dates 971-980)
- Sigeric (c.980? to c. 985)
- Wulfric I (985?-1006)
- Ælfmær (1006-1023/1027)
- Wulfric II (1045-1061)
- Æthelsige (1061-1067/1070)

=== From the Norman Conquest to the abbey's dissolution ===
- Scolland or Scotland (1070-1087)
- Wido or Guy (1087-c. 1093)
- Hugh de Flori (Fleury?) (date of election uncertain, blessed as abbot 1108, died 1126)
- Hugh of Trottiscliffe (1126-1151)
- Silvester (1151-1161)
- Clarembald (1163-1173 deposed)
- Vacancy (1173-1175)
- Roger I (1175-1213)
- Alexander (1213-1220)
- Hugh III (1220-1224)
- Robert of Battle (1224-1253)
- Roger II of Chichester (1253-1273)
- Nicholas Thorne (1273-1283 resigned)
- Thomas Fyndon (1283-1309)
- Ralph Burne (1309-1334)
- Thomas Poucyn (1334-1343)
- William Drulege (1343-1346)
- John Devenish (1346-1348)
- Thomas Colwell (1348-1375)
- Michael Pecham (1375-1387)
- William Welde (elected 1387, blessed 1387, died 1405)
- Thomas Hunden (1405-1420)
- Marcellus Daundelyon (1420-1426)
- John Hawkhurst (1427-1430)
- George Pensherst (1430-1457)
- James Sevenoke (1457-1464)
- William Sellyng (1464-1482 resigned)
- John Dunster (1482-1496)
- John Dygon (1487-1510)
- Thomas Hampton (1510-1522)
- John Essex or Foche (1522-1538, surrendered abbey to the crown)

== See also ==
- List of monastic houses in Kent
- List of monastic houses in England
- St Augustine's Conduit House
