= Knoyle =

Knoyle is a surname. Notable people with the surname include:

- Kyle Knoyle (born 1996), English footballer
- Tavis Knoyle (born 1990), Welsh rugby union footballer

== See also ==
- East Knoyle
- West Knoyle
