= Hodierna =

- Gender: Female

Origin
- Origin: Latin
- Meaning: Daily
- Region of origin: Latin

Hodierna is an English and French feminine given name derived from Latin, meaning daily.

The name has been conjectured to come from the phrase 'Deus cuius hodierna die', in the collects for the Innocents and Epiphany.

== People with the given name ==
- Hodierna of Gometz (died 1108), French noblewoman
- Hodierna of Jerusalem (1110–1164), countess consort of Tripoli
- Hodierna of St Albans (fl. 1150–1210), mother of Alexander Neckam and wet nurse to Richard I of England

== People with the surname ==
- Giovanni Battista Hodierna (1597–1660), astronomer
