= Albinus (abbot) =

Abbot and historian in England (died 732)

Albinus (died 732) was an abbot of St Augustine's Abbey, Canterbury. He assisted Bede in the compilation of his Historia Ecclesiastica, and what we know concerning him is chiefly derived from the dedicatory epistle at the beginning of that work. Albinus was a pupil of Archbishop Theodore and his coadjutor Adrian of Canterbury, abbot of St. Peter's. Through the instructions of the latter he became not only versed in the Scriptures, but likewise a master of Greek and Latin (Chron. G. Thorne). On the death of Adrian, Albinus succeeded to the abbacy, being the first native Englishman who filled that post. Bede in his epistle says that he was indebted to Albinus for all the facts contained in his history relating to the Kentish church between the first conversion of the English and the time at which he was writing. Much of this information was collected by the presbyter Nothelm, who, at the instigation of Albinus, undertook a journey to Rome and searched the archives there. Nothelm was the medium of communication between Bede and Albinus, for it does not appear that the two ever met. Albinus died in 732, and was buried beside his master Adrian.
