= Alexander Neckam =

English poet and theologian (1157–1217)

- Born: 8 September 1157; St Albans
- Died: 31 March 1217; Kempsey
- Resting place: Worcester Cathedral
- Education: St Albans School
- Occupations: magnetician; poet; theologian
- Mother: Hodierna of St Albans

Alexander Neckam (Note: Also spelled Necham or Nequam.) (8 September 1157 – 31 March 1217) was an English poet, theologian, and writer. He was an abbot of Cirencester Abbey from 1213 until his death.

== Early life ==
Born on 8 September 1157 in St Albans, Alexander shared his birthday with King Richard I. For this reason, his mother, Hodierna of St Albans, was hired by the royal household under Henry II to serve as a wet nurse for the future monarch. As a result, Alexander was raised as Richard's foster-brother in their early years.

== Cirencester Abbey ==
Alexander was the abbot of Cirencester Abbey from 1213 until his death, having previously been a canon there. In 1204, while still a canon, he and another canon of Cirencester accompanied Martin, the prior of Llanthony Priory, to a meeting with Henry de Bohun, Earl of Hereford. Alexander spoke on Martin's behalf in an attempt to repair relations between the two men.

== Works ==
=== Speculum speculationum ===
The Speculum speculationum (edited by Rodney M. Thomson, 1988) is Neckam's major surviving contribution to the science of theology. It is unfinished in its current form, but covers a fairly standard range of theological topics derived from Peter Lombard's Sentences and Augustine. Neckam is not regarded as an especially innovative or profound theologian, although he is notable for his early interest in the ideas of St. Anselm of Canterbury. His outlook in the Speculum, a work written very late in his life, probably in 1215, and perhaps drawing heavily on his teaching notes from the past decades, combines an interest in the Platonic writings of earlier 12th-century thinkers such as Thierry of Chartres and William of Conches, with an early appreciation of the newly translated writings of Aristotle and Avicenna. Neckam was a firm admirer of Aristotle as an authority in natural science as well as in the logical arts, one of the first Latin thinkers since antiquity to credit this aspect of the Stagirite's output.

In the Speculum speculationum Alexander identifies one of his key purposes as combating the Cathar heresy, particularly its belief in dualism. He spends a large part of Book 1 on this, and thereafter passes on to focus on his other key purpose, the application of dialectic logic to the study of theology.

=== De utensilibus and De naturis rerum ===
Besides theology, Neckam was interested in the study of grammar and natural history, but his name is chiefly associated with nautical science. In his De utensilibus and De naturis rerum (both written at about 1190), Neckam has preserved to us the earliest European notices of the magnetized needle as a guide to seamen and the earliest European description of the compass. Outside China, these seem to be the earliest records. (Note: The Chinese encyclopaedist Shen Kuo gave the first clear account of suspended magnetic compasses a hundred years earlier, in 1088 AD, in his book Mengxibitan, or Dream Pool Essays.) It was probably in Paris that Neckam heard how a ship, among its other stores, must have a magnetised needle, mounted on a pivot, which would rotate until it pointed north and thus guide sailors in murky weather or on starless nights. Neckam does not seem to think of this as a startling novelty: he merely records what had apparently become the regular practice of many seamen of the Catholic world.

However, De naturis rerum itself was written as a preface to Neckam's commentary on the book of Ecclesiastes, itself a part of a wider programme of biblical commentary encompassing the Song of Solomon and the Psalms, representing the three branches of wisdom literature. It was not intended as an independent and free-standing encyclopedic work in its own right, and indeed it is mostly filled with fanciful moralising allegories rather than a detailed natural philosophy.

See Thomas Wright's edition of Neckam's De naturis rerum and De laudibus divinae sapientiae in the Rolls Series (1863), and of the De utensilibus in his Volume of Vocabularies.

Out of all Neckam's writings on natural history, the De naturis rerum, a sort of manual of the scientific knowledge of the 12th century, is by far the most important: the magnet passage referred to above is in Book 2, Chapter 98 (De vi attractiva), p. 183 of Wright's edition. The corresponding section in the De utensilibus is on p. 114 of the Volume of Vocabularies.

=== Other works ===
Neckam also displays a keen interest in contemporary medical science. In particular he draws many ideas from the philosophical writings of the Salernitan medical master Urso of Calabria, particularly De commixtionibus elementorum on humoral theory.

Neckam also wrote Corrogationes Promethei, a scriptural commentary prefaced by a treatise on grammatical criticism; a translation of Aesop into Latin elegiacs (six fables from this version, as given in a Paris manuscript, are printed in Robert's Fables inedites); commentaries, on portions of Aristotle and Ovid's Metamorphoses, which remain unprinted, and on Martianus Capella, which has recently received an edition, and on other works.

His version of Aesop's fables in elegiac verse, called Novus Aesopus, is a collection of 42 fables taken from the prose Romulus. He also composed a shorter Novus Avianus, taken from Avianus. A supplementary poem to De laudibus divinae sapientiae, called simply the Suppletio defectuum, covers further material on animals and the natural world, as well as cosmology, free will, astrology and the human soul. An edition of this and several of Neckam's minor poems, edited by P. Hochgurtel, was published as a part of the Brepols Corpus Christianorum Continuatio Medievalis series in 2008.

It has been speculated (Spargo, Virgil the Necromancer, 1934) that Neckam might also have been unwittingly responsible for starting the late medieval legends about Virgil's alleged magical powers. In commenting on Virgil, Neckam used the phrase "Vergilius fecit Culicem" to describe the writing of one of Virgil's earlier poems, Culex ("The Gnat"). This may have been misinterpreted by later readers as "Virgil made a gnat" and formed the basis for the legend of Virgil's magic fly which killed all other flies it came across and thus preserved civic hygiene.

== Selected publications ==
- Neckam, Alexander (1863). Wright, Thomas (ed.). De naturis rerum libri duo. With the poem of the same author, De laudibus divinæ sapientiæ. Rolls Series. Thomas Wright (ed.). London: Longman, Green, Longman, Roberts, and Green. doi:10.1017/CBO9781139208239. ISBN 9781139208239.
- Neckam, Alexander (2008). Suppletio defectuum, Carmina minora. Corpus Christianorum, continuatio mediaevalis. Vol. 221. Peter Hochgürtel (ed.). Turnhout: Brepols. ISBN 978-2-503-05211-3.
- Neckam, Alexander (2010). Sacerdos ad altare. Corpus Christianorum, continuatio mediaevalis. Vol. 227. Christopher J. McDonough (ed.). Turnhout: Brepols. ISBN 978-2-503-53349-0.

== See also ==
- Alexander le Pargiter, also called Alexander of St Albans, a contemporary abbot and writer.
- History of geomagnetism
