= Christopher Willoughby (MP) =

16th-century English politician

Christopher Willoughby (by 1508 – 1570), of West Knoyle, Wiltshire, was an English politician.

== Family ==
Willoughby was the illegitimate son of Sir William Willoughby of Turners Puddle, Dorset, also an MP, son of John Willoughby and Anne Cheyne. He was probably educated at Lincoln's Inn. He married twice. Firstly he married a woman named Alice, the widow of one Bulstrode. At some point by 1547, he had married his second wife, Isabel née Wykes, a daughter of Nicholas Wykes of Dodington, Gloucestershire, widow of John Ringwood of Sherfield English, Hampshire, by whom he had four sons and four daughters.

== Career ==
He was a Member (MP) of the Parliament of England for Wilton in 1545 and for Wiltshire in November 1554.
