= West Knoyle =

Village in Wiltshire, England

Coordinates: 51.092°N 2.204°W

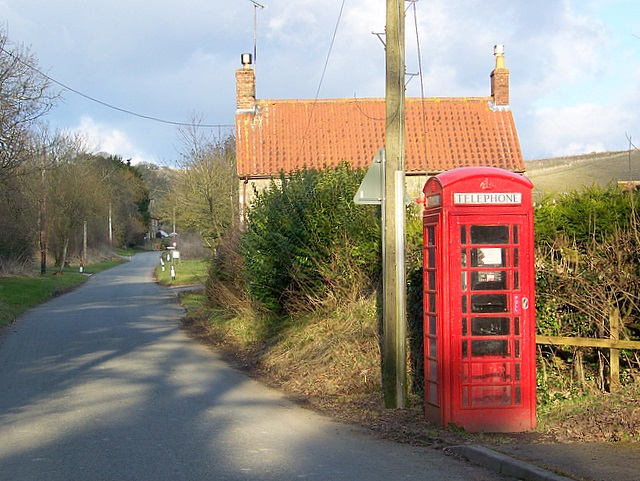
- Telephone box, West Knoyle

- Location within Wiltshire
- Population: 146 (in 2011)
- OS grid reference: ST858325
- Civil parish: West Knoyle
- Unitary authority: Wiltshire
- Ceremonial county: Wiltshire
- Region: South West
- Country: England
- Sovereign state: United Kingdom
- Post town: Warminster
- Postcode district: BA12
- Dialling code: 01747
- Police: Wiltshire
- Fire: Dorset and Wiltshire
- Ambulance: South Western
- UK Parliament: South West Wiltshire
- Website: Parish Council

West Knoyle is a small village and civil parish in southwest Wiltshire, England, close to the southern edge of Salisbury Plain. The village is about 2.5 miles (4 km) east of Mere and 8 miles (13 km) south of Warminster. The A303 trunk road passes 0.75 miles (1,210 m) north of the village.

== History ==
A prehistoric bowl barrow, 8 metres in diameter, lies on high ground northeast of the village. A Romano-British pavement was found at Willoughby Hedge during widening of the A303. The Domesday Book recorded 23 households at Chenvel in 1086, on land owned by Wilton Abbey.

Wilton Abbey held the manor until the dissolution; later landowners include Christopher Willoughby (c.1508–1570), a Member of Parliament.

Past names for the parish include Knoyle Hodierne or Odierne – after Hodierna of St Albans, wet nurse of Richard I of England, who had an estate at Chippenham – and Little Knoyle.

Manor Farmhouse, with 16th-century origins, altered in the 17th and 19th century, may have material and fittings from the manor house which stood north of the church and was demolished in 1745.

== Parish church ==
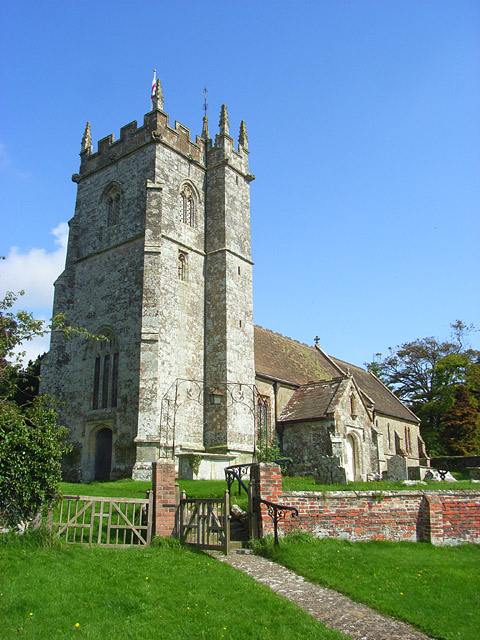
St Mary's Church

The parish church of St Mary the Virgin, in the north of the present village, is a Grade II* listed building. It has 13th-century origins but was heavily restored in 1876–78, except for the 15th-century west tower.

Four of the five bells are from the 17th century; they are said to be unringable and out of tune.

The parish was a chapelry of North Newnton, over twenty miles to the northeast (another holding of Wilton Abbey), until the two parishes were separated in 1841. The benefice was united with Mere in 1929, and a curate was appointed to live at West Knoyle; in 1976 Maiden Bradley was added to the united benefice, which continues today.

== Amenities ==
The Victorian former school is used as the village hall.

The Monarch's Way long-distance footpath passes through the village. Hang Wood, to the southeast, is a biological Site of Special Scientific Interest.
