= Hodierna of St Albans =

Mother of Alexander Neckam and wet nurse to Richard I of England

Hodierna of St Albans (fl. 1150–1210) was the mother of Alexander Neckam and wet nurse of Richard I of England. Hodierna is also known as Audierne.

According to legend, Richard I and Alexander Neckam were born on the same day. The astrological significance of these two births may be the reason Hodierna was chosen as wet nurse. The boys were breastfed together, although as heir to the throne Richard was given the right breast which was believed to produce richer milk.

Wet nurse to the young princes was an honoured position and Hodierna was given a home in the King's Houses. However, if Richard became ill or died, Hodierna could be blamed. Transitioning into a nanny role as Richard got older, Hodierna was Richard's main source of maternal affection in his early years as his mother was often away.

Richard did not forget Hodierna as he got older. Records show that when he was King, Richard gave Hodierna a generous pension.

The village of West Knoyle in Wiltshire was formerly known as Knoyle Hodierne after her.
