= Domne Eafe =

Granddaughter of King Eadbald of Kent

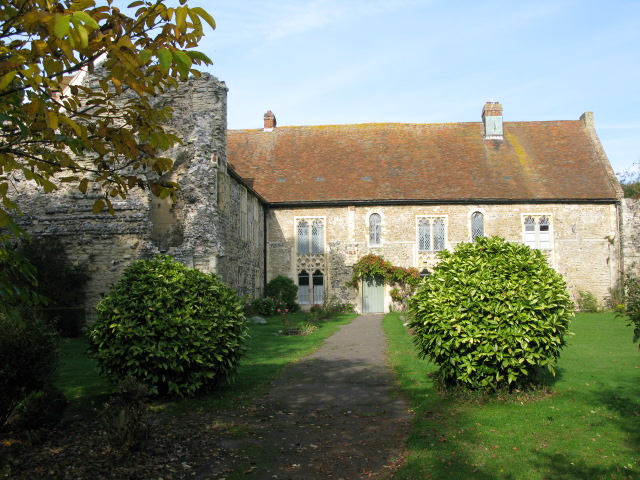
Minster in Thanet Priory, on the Isle of Thanet, Kent

Domne Eafe (Old English pronunciation: [ˈdomne ˈæɑve]; floruit late 7th century), also Domneva, Domne Éue, Æbbe, Ebba, was, according to the Kentish royal legend, a granddaughter of King Eadbald of Kent and the foundress of the double monastery of Minster in Thanet Priory at Minster-in-Thanet during the reign of her cousin King Ecgberht of Kent. A 1000-year-old confusion with her sister Eormenburg means she is often now known by that name. Married to Merewalh of Mercia, she had at least four children. When her two brothers, Æthelred and Æthelberht, were murdered (and subsequently venerated as saintly martyrs) she obtained the land in Thanet to build an abbey, from a repentant King Ecgberht. Her three daughters all went on to become abbesses and saints, the most famous of which, Mildrith, ended up with a shrine in St Augustine's Abbey, Canterbury.

== Origins ==
According to the Kentish royal legend, Domne Eafe's father was Eormenred, son of King Eadbald of Kent and Emma of Austrasia, and grandson of Æthelberht of Kent, England's first Christian king. Domne Eafe's mother is called Oslafa. It is probable that Eormenred shared the kingship of Kent with his brother Eorcenberht, the senior king, and also that he predeceased Eorcenberht.

The legend records several children of Eormenred and Oslafa. Their sons Æthelberht and Æthelred were murdered during the reign of their cousin King Ecgberht of Kent. Their daughters are less certainly identifiable. Eormengyth, according to the legend, was buried in the countryside near to Minster-in-Thanet and was reckoned a saint in later Anglo-Saxon times. Eormengyth was the sister of Æbbe and Eormenburh [circular link]. She was married to King Centwine of Wessex who ruled from 676 to 685 but became abbess as a widow possibly back in Kent (c. 695–705) in succession to her sister.

== Domne Eafe and Eormenburg ==
From at least the 1030s, Domne Eafe has been described as also named Eormenburg (or such variants as Irmenburg and Ermenburga). The given name of Domne Eafe appears to be very uncertain. Domne would seem to be a title, implying that she was a highly respected lady, while Eafe could be a variant of Eve (and so could be her given name) or Abbess (i.e. yet another title). There are six Anglo-Saxon charters (legal documents) dating from the time she was Abbess, all of which simply refer to her by the Latin title (or name) Æbbe. One of these, a Charter from 699, names three other 'renowned abbesses', Hirminhilda, Irminburga and Nerienda, who, along with Æbbe, are present to witness that various privileges had been granted to the Kent Churches. This enabled David Rollason, writing in 1982, to conclude, despite the variant spellings, that they were two individuals.

The next known references to either name are written some 300 years later, when various different accounts of the Kentish Royal Legend were written up. Three of these documents introduce the idea that Domne Eafe and Eormenburg were the same person. Others, such as a genealogy from Ramsey Abbey, identify Eormenburg as a sister of Eafe. However, the 10th- and 11th-century texts, even those that offer Eormenburg as an alternative, then use Domne Eafe and its variants throughout their texts.

Uneasiness appears to set in after that date about the idea that there were sisters, Eormengith, Eormenburg and Domne Eafe, of which one name didn't seem to be part of the set. From the 12th century onwards, some writers have liked the idea that a Kentish monastic princess should be called Eormenburg rather than Domne Eafe, and thus only refer to Ermenburg (or variants), as the Abbess of Thanet and mother of Mildrith. Following a lead perhaps given by William of Malmesbury in c. 1135 books such as 'Villages of Britain', web sites such as 'Hidden historical heroines', and modern lists of saints refer to her simply as Ermenburg.

== The legend ==
The legend survives in varying forms in a number of manuscripts which date from the eleventh and twelfth centuries (and later copies). These include a life of Saints Æthelberht and Æthelred in the Historia Regum, compiled at Ramsey Abbey by the monk Byrhtferth; a life of Mildrith by Goscelin and rebuttal, by him, to the claims by St Gregory's Priory, Canterbury to having the relics of Saints Mildrith and Eadburg, by way of Lyminge. St Gregory's too produced their own account, preserved in a manuscript held in Gotha.

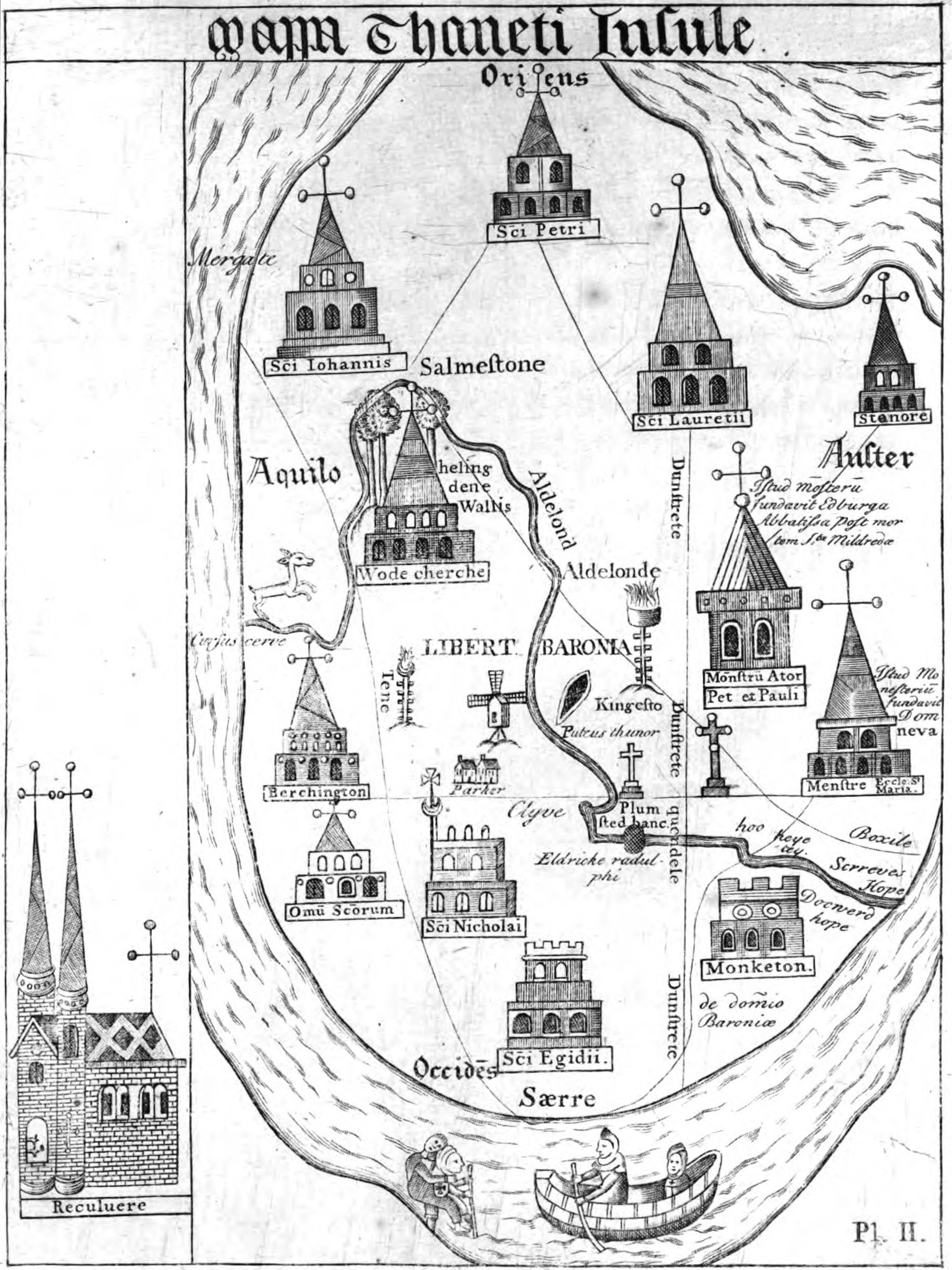
Engraving of a medieval map of Thanet with the line of Cursus Cerve (the course of the hind also known as St Mildred’s Lynch)

According to the legend, Domne Eafe, daughter of Eormenred, a sub-king of Kent, marries Merewalh, a Mercian king of Magonsæte, by whom she has a son, Merfin (known as 'The Holy Child', who died while young) and three daughters, none of whom married, and all were proclaimed saints. On the death of Eormenred, Domne Eafe's younger brothers, Saints Æthelberht and Æthelred, were fostered by their cousin, king Ecgberht, and were murdered by the king's reeve, called Thunor, either on the king's command or on his own initiative. In order to quench the family feud which this kinslaying would have provoked, Ecgberht agreed to pay a wergild for the murdered princelings. The legend claims that Domne Eafe was offered (or requested) as much land as her pet hind could run around in a single lap. The result whether by miraculous guidance (as most texts imply), or because the hind goes wherever Domne Eafe guides it, (as the Caligula A text claims) was that she gained some eighty sulungs of land on Thanet as weregild, on which to establish a dual monastery. The boundary was a line called Cursus Cerve also known as St Mildred’s Lynch. Domne Eafe is, by all the accounts, succeeded as abbess by her daughter Mildrith.

It is thought likely that the legend's details are all considerably earlier than the date of the surviving manuscripts. It contains features, such as the establishment of a monastery in compensation for kinslaying (an analogous case is recorded by Bede in the case of the killing of King Oswine of Deira by King Oswiu of Bernicia), which would be unexpected to originate with an 11th-century text. Circumstantial evidence would date the earliest version of the legend from the time of Saint Eadburg (died 751?), Mildrith's successor as abbess of Minster-in-Thanet.

== Charter evidence ==
A number of Kentish charters from the reigns of Oswine and Wihtred name Domne Eafe, or rather "Æbbe", as witness or beneficiary of grants to Minster-in-Thanet. Rollason argues that these show that Minster-in-Thanet was the main beneficiary of Kentish royal patronage of monasteries, surpassing even St Augustine's Abbey in Canterbury.

No charters survive from Ecgberht's reign, and written charters only began anywhere at around that period, so the original grant may have been oral rather than written. The 15th-century historian Thomas of Elmham recorded a later charter, which has now been lost, in his history of St Augustine's, Canterbury.. This dated from 678, during the reign of Egcberht's brother and successor Hlothhere. The Rolls Series edition of Thomas's history includes as its frontispiece a map that he drew showing Thanet and the course taken across the island by Domne Eafe's pet hind, a route which followed a ditch and marked the boundary of Canterbury's estates on Thanet.

== Family tree ==
The Kentish royal legend includes expansive genealogical sections which appear to differ from most Anglo-Saxon genealogies both in their fuller treatment of female lines, and in having no interest in Pagan warlord ancestors. By contrast its chief interest is in recording the ability of the royal line of Christian kings to produce female saints. At least eleven are incorporated into the genealogy, including not just the Kentish princesses, but those from the East Anglian, Mercian and Magonsaetan kingdoms into which they married. From Æthelberht I, whose reign may have begun in 560, down to Domne Eafe's three daughters, all acclaimed as saints, who are thought to have died in the early 8th century. The family tree below, based solely on the information in the various versions of the Kentish royal legend, finds various points of corroboration in Bede's writings and in other early documents. Other individuals and relationships are known only from the legend.

Family tree

Æthelberht I king of Kent	Bertha
Edwin king of the Northumbrians	St Æthelburg of Liminge	Eadbald king of Kent	Emma
St Seaxburh of Ely	Eorcenberht king of Kent	St Eanswith of Folkestone	Eormenred ? king of Kent	Oslafa
Ecgberht king of Kent	Domne Eafe	Merewalh king of the Magonsæte	St Æthelred	St Æthelberht	Eormenburg	Eormengyth
Merefin	St Mildrith of Thanet	St Mildburh of Wenlock	St Mildgyth
