= Mildrith =

Anglo-Saxon abbess and saint

Saint Mildrith

Abbess
- Born: unknown, c. 660
- Died: unknown, c. 730-731; Minster-in-Thanet
- Venerated in: Catholic Church; Anglican Communion; Eastern Orthodox Church
- Canonized: 1388 by Urban VI
- Major shrine: Minster-in-Thanet; St Augustine's Abbey, Canterbury
- Feast: 13 July
- Attributes: Princess's crown, Abbess's crozier, hind

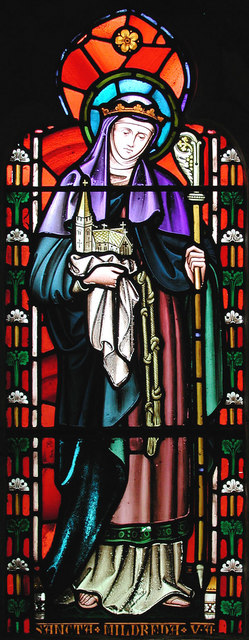
St Mildred, Preston-next-Wingham, Kent

Saint Mildrith, also Mildthryth, Mildryth and Mildred, (Old English: Mildþrȳð) (born c. 660, died after 732), was a 7th- and 8th-century Anglo-Saxon abbess of the Abbey at Minster-in-Thanet, Kent. She was declared a saint after her death, and, in 1030, her remains were moved to Canterbury.

== Life and family ==
Mildrith was the daughter of King Merewalh of Magonsaete, an area similar to the present day Herefordshire, a sub-kingdom of Mercia. Her mother was Domne Eafe (also sometimes named as Saint Eormenburga), herself a great-granddaughter of Æthelberht of Kent, and as such appearing in the so-called Kentish Royal Legend.

Her sisters Milburga of Much Wenlock and Mildgyth were also considered saints, and Mildrith, along with her extended family, features in the Kentish Royal Legend, also known as the "Mildrith Legend". In the 11th century, Goscelin wrote a hagiography of Mildrith, the Vita Mildrethae. Another work, the Nova Legenda Anglie of 1516, gives an extensive account of her life.

Mildrith's maternal family had close ties to the Merovingian rulers of Gaul, and Mildrith is said to have been educated at the prestigious Merovingian royal abbey of Chelles. She entered the abbey of Minster-in-Thanet, which her mother had established, and became abbess there by 694. A number of dedications to Mildrith exist in the Pas-de-Calais, including at Millam, thereby suggesting that ties to Gaul were maintained. Mildrith died at Minster-in-Thanet some time after 732 and was buried there in the Abbey Church of St Mary.

== Relic remains ==
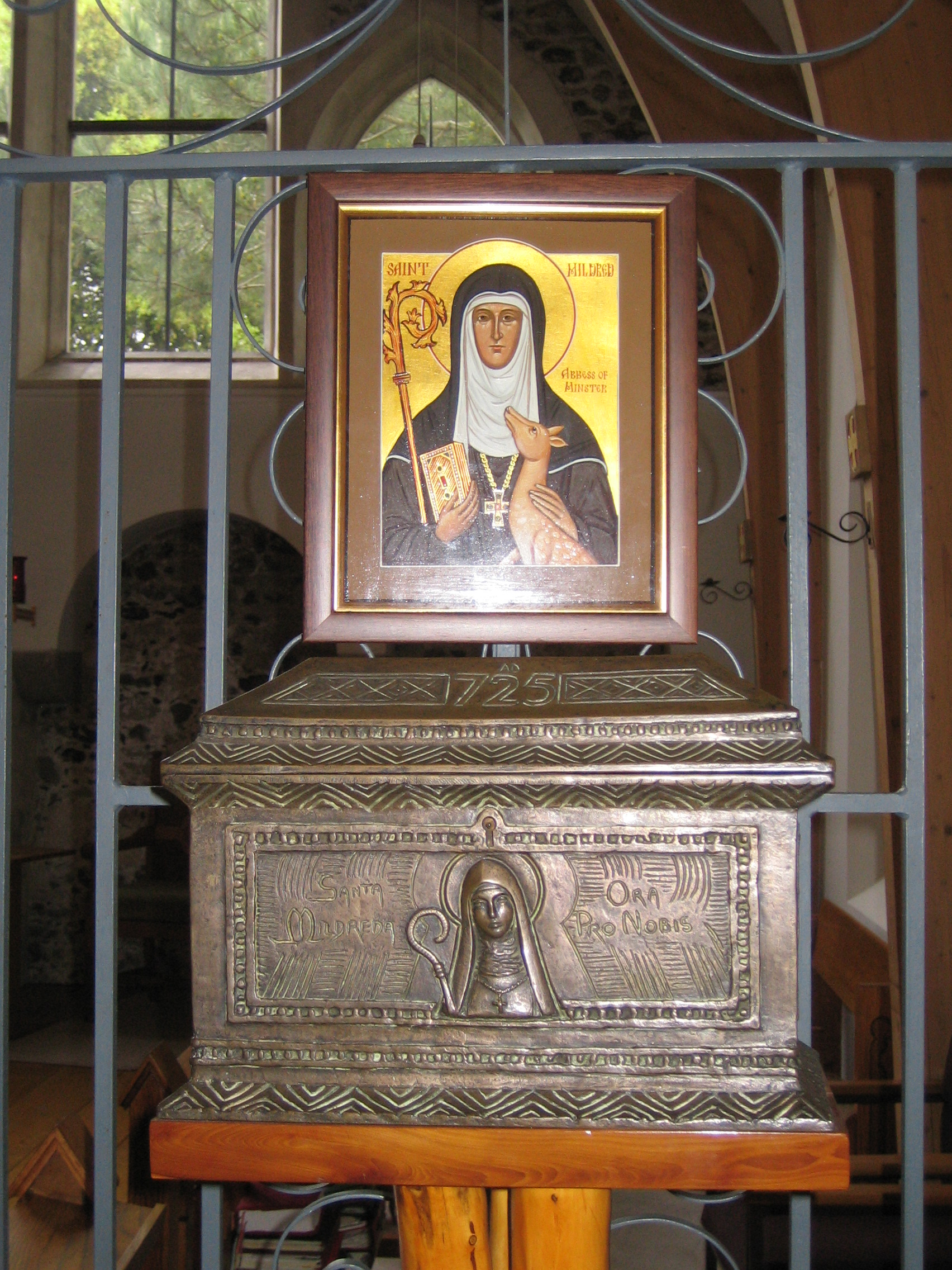
Bronze casket for St Mildred's relics in Minster Abbey, made (1955) by Sister Concordia Scott

Mildrith's successor as abbess, Eadburg (also styled Edburga of Minster-in-Thanet, a correspondent of Saint Boniface), built a new abbey church, also at Minster-in-Thanet, dedicated to Ss Peter and Paul, and translated Mildrith's remains there not later than 748. The shrine within the abbey became a popular place of local pilgrimage, with Mildrith becoming a much-loved local patron saint.

The last abbess of Minster in Thanet was Leofruna, who was captured by Danes in 1011. The abbey was abandoned and the church downgraded to a parish church. Mildrith's remains, despite fierce local opposition, were translated to St Augustine's Abbey, Canterbury in 1030, an event commemorated on 18 May. St Mildred's Church, Canterbury, within the town walls, dates back to this time.

Some of her relics were given, in the 11th century, to a church at Deventer, Netherlands. In 1881 the feast day of St Mildred was officially reinstated by Pope Leo XIII. In 1882, following a refounding of a Benedictine monastery at Minster in Thanet, the nuns petitioned the Archbishop of Utrecht, who granted their return to Thanet. It became a private house until 1937, when it was purchased by Benedictine nuns from St Walburga's Abbey in Eichstätt, Bavaria, as a refuge from persecution and became a dependent priory. In 1953, a relic of St Mildred was brought there.

== Family tree ==
The family tree of this part of the royal family of Kent in the 7th century is derived from the later Old English and Latin accounts. Eadbold became king in 616 A.D, succeeded by Eorcantberht in 640 A.D. (possibly co-ruling with his brother Eormenred, Mildrith's grandfather). Ecgberht came to the throne in 664 and died in 673 A.D.

Family of Mildrith

Eadbald king of Kent	Emma
St Seaxburh of Ely	Eorcenberht king of Kent	St Eanswith of Folkestone	Eormenred ? king of Kent	Oslafa
Ecgberht king of Kent	Merewalh king of the Magonsæte	Domne Eafe	St Æthelred	St Æthelberht	Eormenburg	Eormengyth
Merefin	St Mildrith	St Mildburh of Wenlock	St Mildgyth

== Literature ==
- Brooks, Beda: The world of Saint Mildred, c. 660–730. A study of an Anglo-Saxon nun in the golden age of the English Church, Bath 1996, ISBN 1-898663-08-4.
- Hollis, Stephanie (1998). "The Minster-in-Thanet foundation story". Anglo-Saxon England. 27. Cambridge University Press: 41–64. doi:10.1017/S0263675100004798.
- Rollason, David W.: The Mildrith legend. A study in early Medieval hagiography in England. Leicester 1982, ISBN 0-7185-1201-4.

== Sources ==
- Love, R. C., "Mildrith, St" in Michael Lapidge et al., The Blackwell Encyclopedia of Anglo-Saxon England. Oxford: Blackwell, 1999. ISBN 0-631-22492-0
- Rollason, D. W., The Mildrith Legend: a study in early medieval hagiography in England (series "Studies in the Early History of Britain", Leicester University Press) 1982. (This includes the full Latin text of the 13th-century Bodley 285 Text and the Vita Mildrethae of Goscelin of Canterbury.)
- Introduction and primary texts of three Anglo-Saxon Lives of St Mildreth, dated between 725 and 974, in Old English: Þá hálgan (aka The Kentish Royal Legend); Caligula 'Life of St Mildrith' (with translation); The Lambeth Palace text of Þá hálgan.
- O.S.B., "Saint Mildred and her Kinsfolk", Virgin Saints of the Benedictine Order, Catholic Truth Society, London, 1903
- Nova Legenda Anglie (first published in 1516. This ed. 1901.) The entry for De Sancta Mildreda is in Vol. II p. 193–197
