= Kentish Royal Legend =

Group of medieval texts

- Mildrith Legend
- Full title: Vita Deo delectae virginis Mildrethae
- Also known as: Minster-in-Thanet foundation story, þa Halgan, S.Mildryð, Vita S. Mildretha
- Language: Old English and Latin
- Date: mid-11th century onwards
- Authenticity: reliable
- Historia Regum text
- Bodley 285
- Vitae Mildrethae
- Cotton Caligula A (OE
- Gotha Text
- British Library: Stowe MS 944, ff 34v-39r (þa Halgan, OE)
- Parker Library, Corpus Christi College, Cambridge No. 201, pp. 147–151 (þa Halgan, OE)
- Cotton Vitellius A 2 ff 3-5 (Latin þa Halgan)
- Hugh Candidus text
- Other Vitae
- Subject: Genealogy, Abbey Foundation, Hagiography
- Period covered: Anglo-Saxon England
- Aethelberht, Eadbald, S. Æthelberht, S. Æthelred, Domne Eafe, S. Mildreth and others

The Kentish Royal Legend is a diverse group of Medieval texts which describe a wide circle of members of the royal family of Kent from the 7th to 8th centuries AD. Key elements include the descendants of Æthelberht of Kent over the next four generations; the establishment of various monasteries, most notably Minster-in-Thanet; and the lives of a number of Anglo-Saxon saints and the subsequent travels of their relics. Although it is described as a legend, and contains a number of implausible episodes, it is placed in a well attested historical context.

== The legend ==
=== Æthelberht and his descendants ===
Almost all the accounts begin by describing how Æthelberht of Kent was baptised by Augustine. The fullest accounts (such as Bodley 285, see below) then provide a substantial genealogy, involving not only his direct descendants but also the families some of the daughters marry into, the kings of Northumbria, Mercia, and East Anglia. The family tree below is David Rollason's summary of the individuals thus described. (♂=male, ♀=female).

Æthelberht and his descendants

Æthelberht ♂	Bertha ♀
Anna ♂ king of East Angles	Hereswith ♀	Edwin ♂ king of Northumbria	Æthelburh ♀	Eadbald ♂ king of Kent	Emma ♀
Ecgfrith ♂ king of Northumbria	St Æthelthryth ♀ of Ely	St Wihtburh ♀ of Ely	St Seaxburh ♀ of Ely	Eorcenberht ♂ king of Kent	St Eanswith ♀ of Folkestone	Eormenred ♂ ? king of Kent	Oslafa ♀
Wulfhere ♂ king of Mercia	St Ermenilda ♀ of Ely	St Eorcengota ♀	Ecgberht ♂ king of Kent
Merewalh king of the Magonsæte	Domne Eafe ♀	St Æthelred ♂	St Æthelberht ♂	Eormenburg ♀	Eormengyth ♀
St Werburgh ♀ of Hanbury	Merefin ♂	St Mildthryth ♀	St Mildburh ♀ of Wenlock	St Mildgyth ♀

=== Foundation of the Abbey at Thanet ===
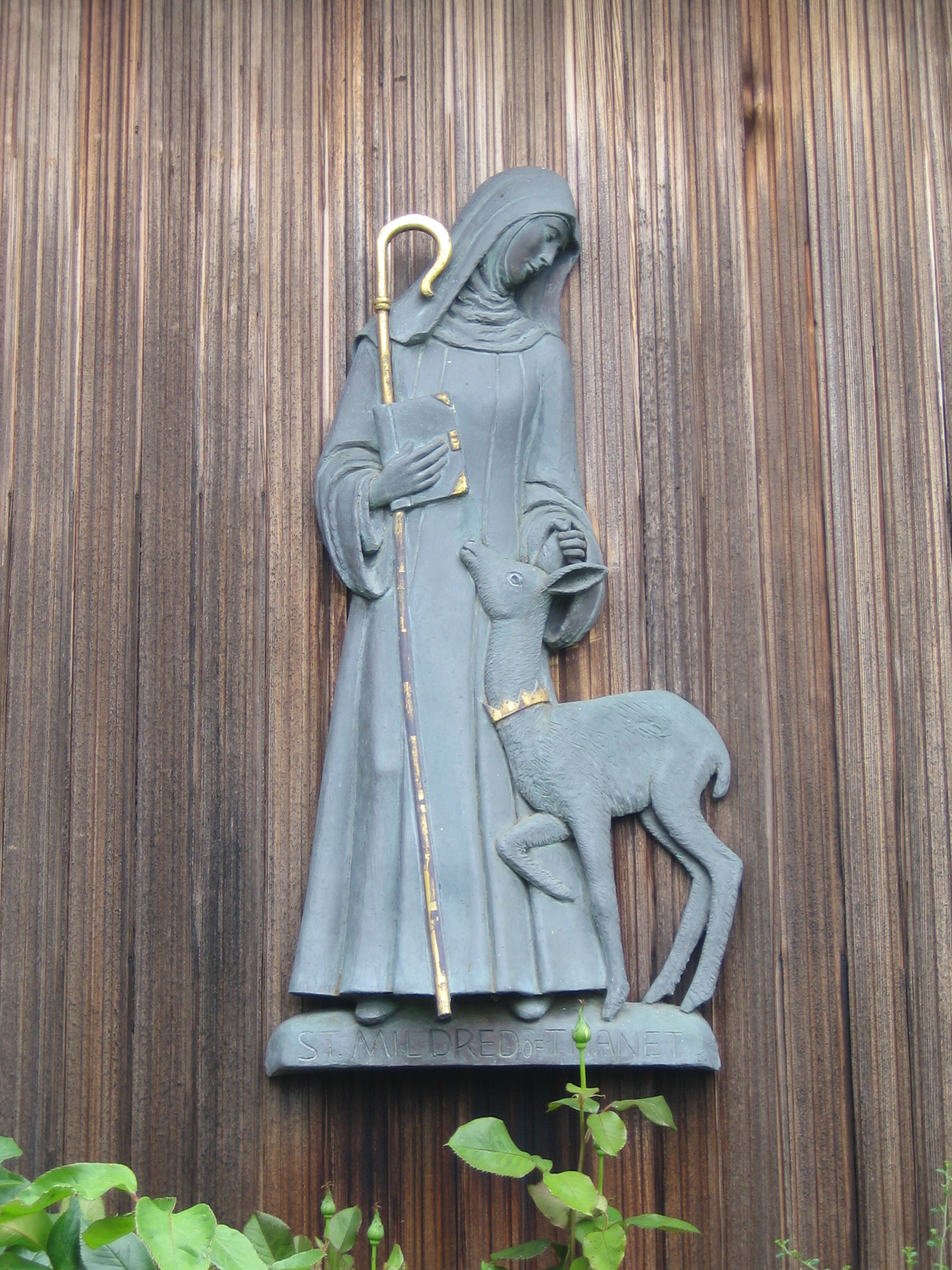
St Mildred of Minster-in-Thanet and the hind from the foundation story. (Sculpture by Concordia Scott)

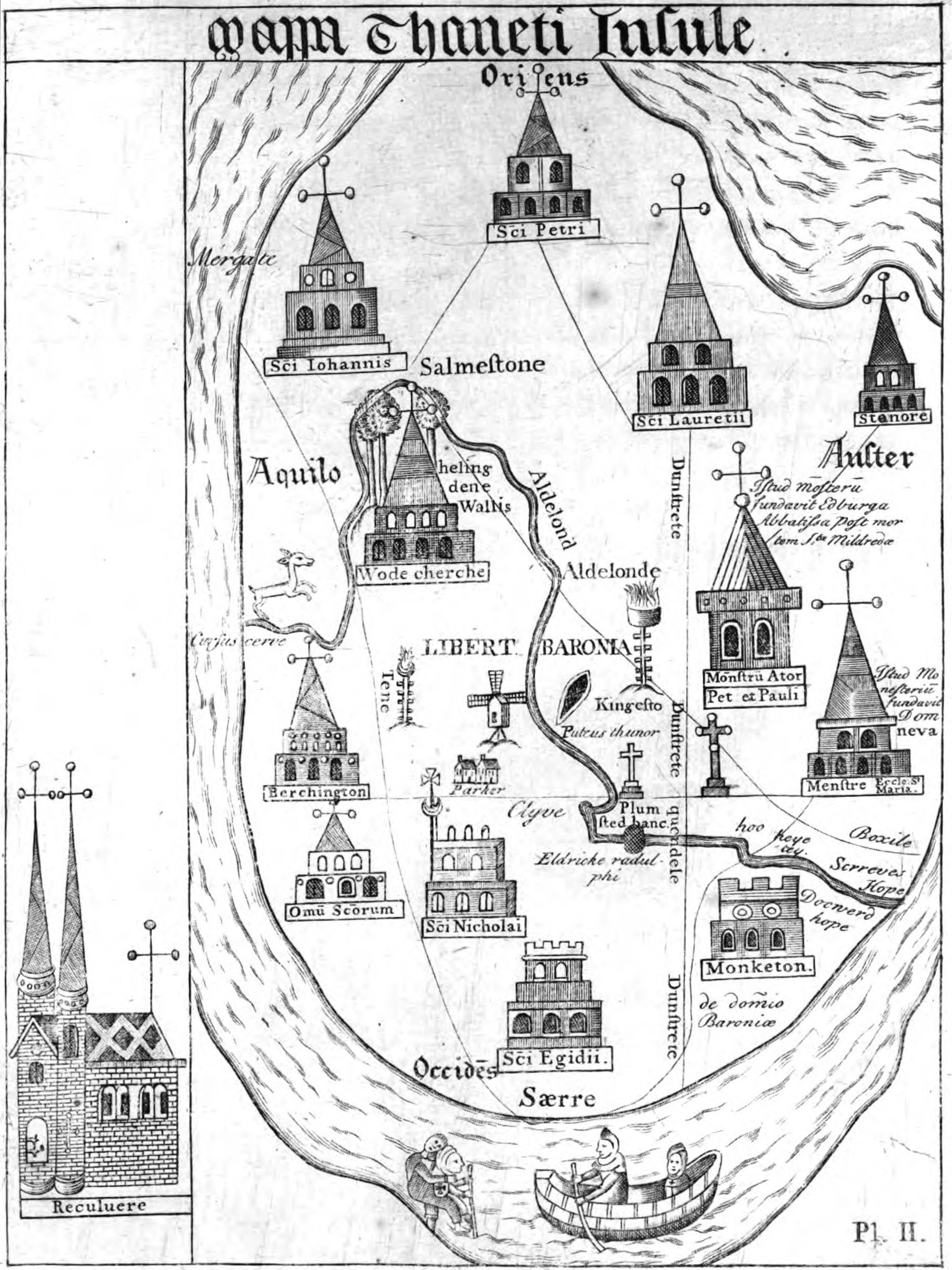
Engraving of a medieval map of Thanet with the line of Cursus Cerve (the course of the hind also known as St Mildred’s Lynch)

The central subject of several versions of the Kentish Royal Legend is an account of the murder of two young princes, restitution by way of land to found an abbey by Domne Eafe, and the life of its second Abbess, Mildrith. Although the details and emphasis of the different tellings of the legend vary, the following covers the main elements of that story.

Domne Eafe, daughter of Eormenred, a king of Kent, had married Merewalh, a Mercian king of Magonsæte, by whom she has a son, Merefin (described as 'The holy child', who died while young) and three daughters. On the death of Eormenred his two sons were entrusted to the care of their uncle Eorcenberht, who respected this trust. On his death, however, his son Ecgberht, corrupted by his attendant, count Thunor, feared the usurpation of the princes (or Thunor feared they would replace him). Ecgberht was finally persuaded, (or gave a command, or acquiesced or on Thunor's own initiative) that Thunor should kill the boys, their bodies being buried under the throne at the royal residence at Eastry.

A mysterious light revealed the location of the dead boys, and a contrite Ecgberht admitted all to his court (or in the case of both Ramsey Abbey texts, discovered all from Thunor). In order to quench the family feud which this kinslaying would have provoked, Ecgberht agreed to pay a wergild for the murdered princelings. Domne Eafe wished for 48 hides of land to establish an abbey on the Isle of Thanet and suggested that the course run by her pet hind should define the bounds. The result, whether by miraculous guidance (as most texts imply), or because the hind went wherever Domne Eafe guided it, (as the Caligula A text claims) was that the requested area was marked out. During the travels of the hind, Thunor began to complain about how much land would be given up, at which point he was swallowed up by the earth, and a great mound, known as Thunures hleaw, was heaped over his burial place. Domne Eafe acquired the land from Ecgberht, and was able to establish a monastery with a Church dedicated to the Virgin Mary.

Domne Eafe had sent her daughter Mildrith to Chelles in France, to study under abbess Wilcoma, where she also collected relics. After having been treated harshly by the abbess, (including an attempt to roast her alive for refusing to marry a relative of the abbess) she fled back to Kent. On landing at Ebbsfleet, the imprint of her sandal was made in a rock, which later had a chapel built over it. Mildrith became a nun at Thanet, and later succeeded her mother to become the second Abbess. On her death (13 July) she was buried in the Church of St Mary, but her successor, Eadburh, built a second Church at Thanet, St Peter and St Paul, and translated her still incorrupt remains there.

=== Lives of the saints ===
Among the genealogies and Thanet narratives are details of the lives and shrines of a large number of Anglo-Saxon saints, particularly those linked with Kent, but also some from (or who went to) Mercia, East Anglia and Northumbria. Some of the texts are specifically concerned with other saints. The two princes, St Mildburh and St Werburgh all have their own medieval 'Life', in which the other events of the legend are woven in with varying amounts of detail. In the texts that form On the Resting-Places of the Saints, a version of the legend (þa Halgan) appears to be provided in place of a Kentish list of saints, to complement the much more systematic lists of saints (the Secgan) from other parts of the country.

== The texts ==
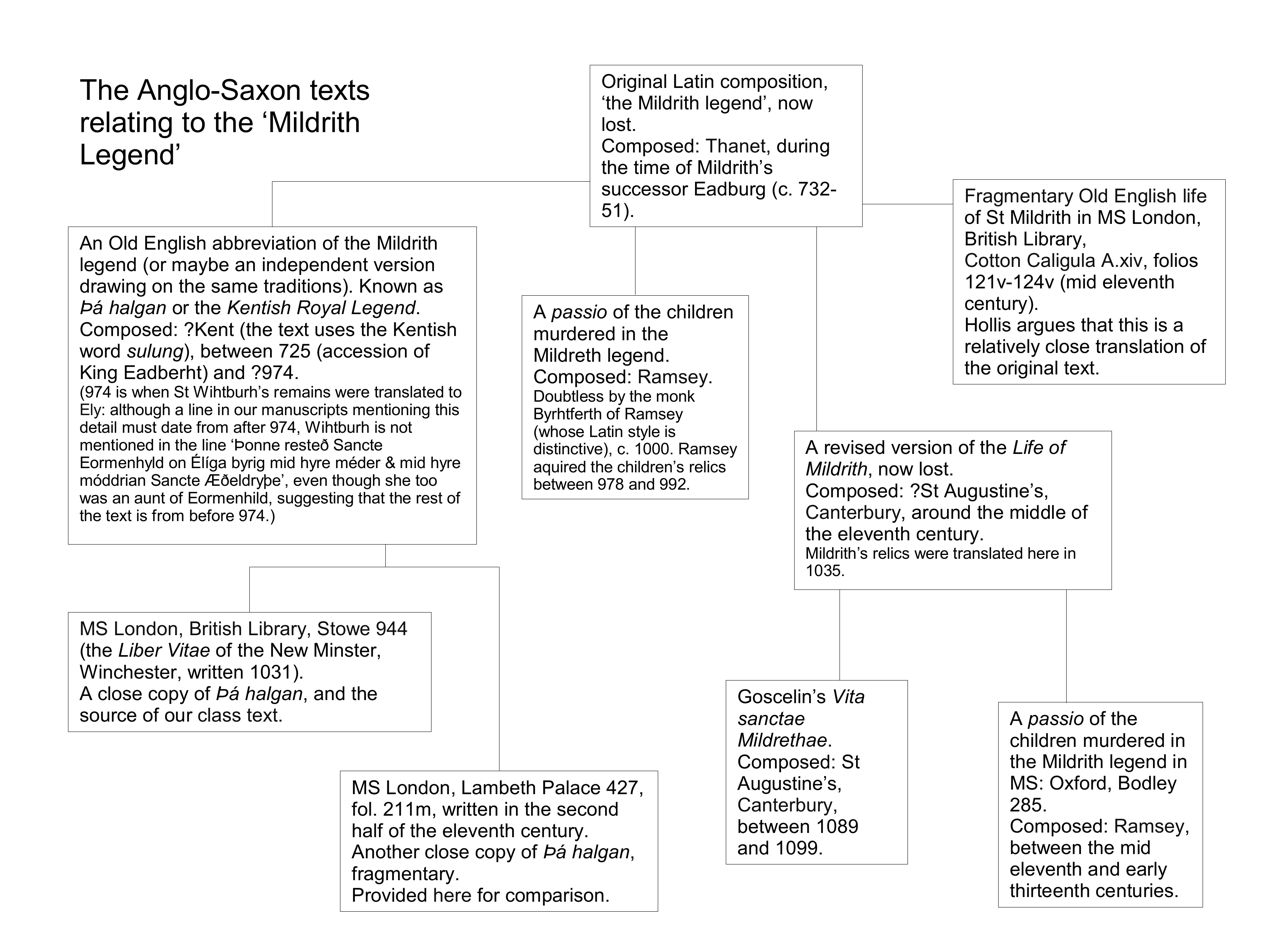
Stemma of Anglo-Saxon texts relating to the 'Mildrith Legend'. Based on David Rollason, The Mildrith Legend: A Study in Early Medieval Hagiography in England (Leicester: Leicester University Press 1982) and Stephanie Hollis, 'The Minster-in-Thanet Foundation Story', Anglo-Saxon England, 27 (1998), 41-64.

It seems likely that precursors to the extant texts must have been written down almost as soon as Mildrith had died. However, the earliest surviving documents containing the legend date from the middle of the 11th century, and others are later still. They clearly draw from now lost source material. These texts now exist as passages within larger manuscripts, and often subsequently either copied into, or bound into still larger volumes. The essentials of the legend are remarkably consistent in the broad outline, the cast of characters, and the various events they describe. But they are also diverse in their detail, and appear to have been substantially moulded to suit the needs of different authors and different perspectives. Some of the texts that contain substantial portions of the legend are:

Historia Regum
Written in Latin at Ramsey Abbey by a monk called Byrhtferth in c1000AD. Its purpose when written was to be a passio on the death of the two murdered princes, who were translated to Ramsey Abbey in 978-92. It was then used as the opening section of a historical miscellany, which was itself written in to the start of Symeon of Durham's 12th century History of the Kings of Britain. Most of the later manuscripts are linked to Canterbury, with a particular interest in promoting interest in St Mildrith. This account from Ramsey Abbey is from 30 years before Mildrith's remains were moved to Canterbury, and so gives a useful re-assurance of the legend pre-dating the Canterbury connection.

Bodley 285 fos 116-121
Also written by the monks of Romney Abbey, in Latin, at a date some time between 1050 and 1220. It is now in the Bodleian Library, Oxford. Bodley 285 (BHL 2641-2) is a collection of saints' Lives, of which the Kentish Legend is in three sections. A Genealogia provides the Kentish family history. A Relatio recounts the events of the murdered princes, Domne Eafe at Thanet, and Mildrith's arrival from France. A shorter Translatio tells of the two princes' translation from Wakering Abbey to Ramsey, and miracles at the Wakering shrine.

Vita St Mildrithae
(BHL 5960) written by Goscelin of Saint-Bertin in c1089-1099 for the Augustinians at Canterbury, following Mildrith's translation there in 1030. Seven medieval copies of this text are noted by Rollason. Cotton MS Vespasian B xx, fos 143–163v has claims to be one of the earliest, written in the early 12th century. As well as the 'Vita', it includes other writings of Goscelin on Mildrith, Archbishops of Canterbury, Papal Bulls, and so forth. Latin text published in full in Rollason, 1982.

Caligula A.xiv fos. 121v-124v
(S.Mildryð). (London British Library, Cotton MS). Written in Old English, mid-11th century. It appears to pre-date Mildrith's translation to Canterbury. One possibility is that it is copied from a text (now lost) that accompanied the relics from Thanet. It has the saints day for a heading so may have been a devotional reader. It breaks off after Thunor's death, in mid sentence. OE transcript and translation by Cockayne, 1864.

== Evolving emphasis of the legend ==
There are at least four key moments in the telling of the events surrounding the foundation of Thanet Abbey, and the emphasis and purpose of the story changes substantially to suit the needs of each of these contexts.

=== Translation of Mildrith to the New Church in Thanet, mid-eighth century ===
The earliest telling would appear to be when the story was set out by Eadburg, the third abbess at Thanet. There is no text dating to that time, but Hollis and Rollason both contend that the Caligula A text has a strong claim to representing the 'Thanet' version of the story. Written in Old English, with considerable uncertainty about its author and date, it recounts the foundation of the Abbey in ways that may be much closer to a mid-8th century account than the other surviving texts. The themes, on that basis, are to chronicle a history of the Abbey, to set out its legal claim to the land, to talk up the Mercian links of the founder (Domne Eafe) and the saint (Mildrith), at a time when Kent was under Mercian rule, and to provide a 'Life of Mildrith' to accompany the translation of her remains from St Mary's Church to Eadburg's new church of St Peter and St Paul, Thanet.

=== Translation of the two Princes from Wakering to Ramsey Abbey, late-tenth century ===
Two texts (known as The Historia Regum text and Bodley 285 text) were written at Ramsey Abbey, both probably by a monk called Byrhtferth, perhaps in preparation for, and subsequent to, the translation of two martyred princes, saints Æthelred and Æthelberht, from their original burial place at Wakering, south-east Essex, to Ramsey Abbey, Huntingdonshire. The two princes were the brothers of Domne Eafe, and all versions agree that it was their murder, as young innocents, that was the spur to Egbert's giving of the land for a monastery. However, the distinctive features of Byrhtferth's Ramsey account are to emphasise the sanctity and virtue of the princes. The genealogy section makes no mention of the many women that are included in the other texts,. It describes a miraculous rather than 'trained' behaviour of the hind, which has the effect of reducing the pro-activeness of the abbess. Byrthferth portrays the Abbesses as meek and holy women, rather than scheming and pro-active. He obscures the wergild origin of the gift of land, perhaps because by the 10th century, such a means of acquiring monastic lands was severely disapproved of.

=== Translation of Saint Mildrith from Thanet to Canterbury, mid-eleventh century ===
Goscelin's Vita St Mildrithae, written at St Augustine's Abbey, Canterbury some time between 1089 and 1099, followed the translation of Mildrith's relics from Thanet to Canterbury in 1030. Thanet had been attacked by Danes on a number of occasions in the 9th and 10th centuries, and the Abbey was finally abandoned in 1011AD. (In 1091 they were translated to the newly built chapel of the Holy Innocents.) Goscelin's account attempts to create a more conventional 'life of the saint' than the earlier texts, but the source material imposes a much more detailed genealogy, Abbey foundation story and explanation of the saint's mother than most such hagiographies would expect. In a number of places Goscelin meets the expectations of his own times in claiming the involvement of Archbishop Theodore where other texts suggest Domne Eafe acted on her own authority, such as the dedication of the Minster, and permission for Mildrith to succeed her as Abbess.).

=== Claim by the Canons of St Gregory's Priory, Canterbury, to have the relics ===
Founded at Canterbury in 1084-5, St Gregory's Abbey began to claim, from 1087, to have the relics of both St Mildrith and her successor as Abbess, St Eadburg, having translated them from Lyminge Abbey. At the time of the translation, two or three years before, they had translated the relics of St Eadburg and an unknown saint. The production of a full account of the lives of Domne Eafe and Mildrith appears to have been made to further this claim. That they produced a text that is broadly very harmonious with other known texts suggests they had a good source document, and it would seem likely that a Thanet-based text had come from Lyminge with the relics. Goscelin, in a document known as the contra usurpatores, strongly disputed their claim on Mildrith. In doing so he describes two separate documents produced by the Gregorians, and it would appear these are now combined into what is known as the Gotha text.

== See also ==
- On the Resting-Places of the Saints (also known as the Secgan)
- List of Anglo-Saxon saints
- List of Anglo-Saxon monarchs and kingdoms
- List of monarchs of Kent
- Kingdom of Kent

== Bibliography ==
- British Library, The Translation of St Mildred, in the 'Life of St Mildred' Harley MS 3908, an early 12th century version of Goscelin's Vita Mildrethae. The British library has a high definition online illuminated first page of the Translatione section.
- Brookes, Stuart; Harrington, Sue (2010), The Kingdom and People of Kent, AD 400-1066: Their History and Archaeology, Stroud: The History Press, ISBN 978-0752456942
- Hollis, Stephanie (1998). "The Minster-in-Thanet foundation story". Anglo-Saxon England. 27. Cambridge University Press: 41–64. doi:10.1017/S0263675100004798.
- Rollason, D. W. (1978). "Lists of saints' resting-places in Anglo-Saxon England". Anglo-Saxon England. 7: 61–93. doi:10.1017/S0263675100002866.
- Rollason, D. W. (1982), The Mildrith Legend: A Study in Early Medieval Hagiography in England, Leicester: Leicester University Press, ISBN 0-7185-1201-4
