= Mildburh =

English Benedictine abbess (died 737)

Saint Mildburh of Wenlock
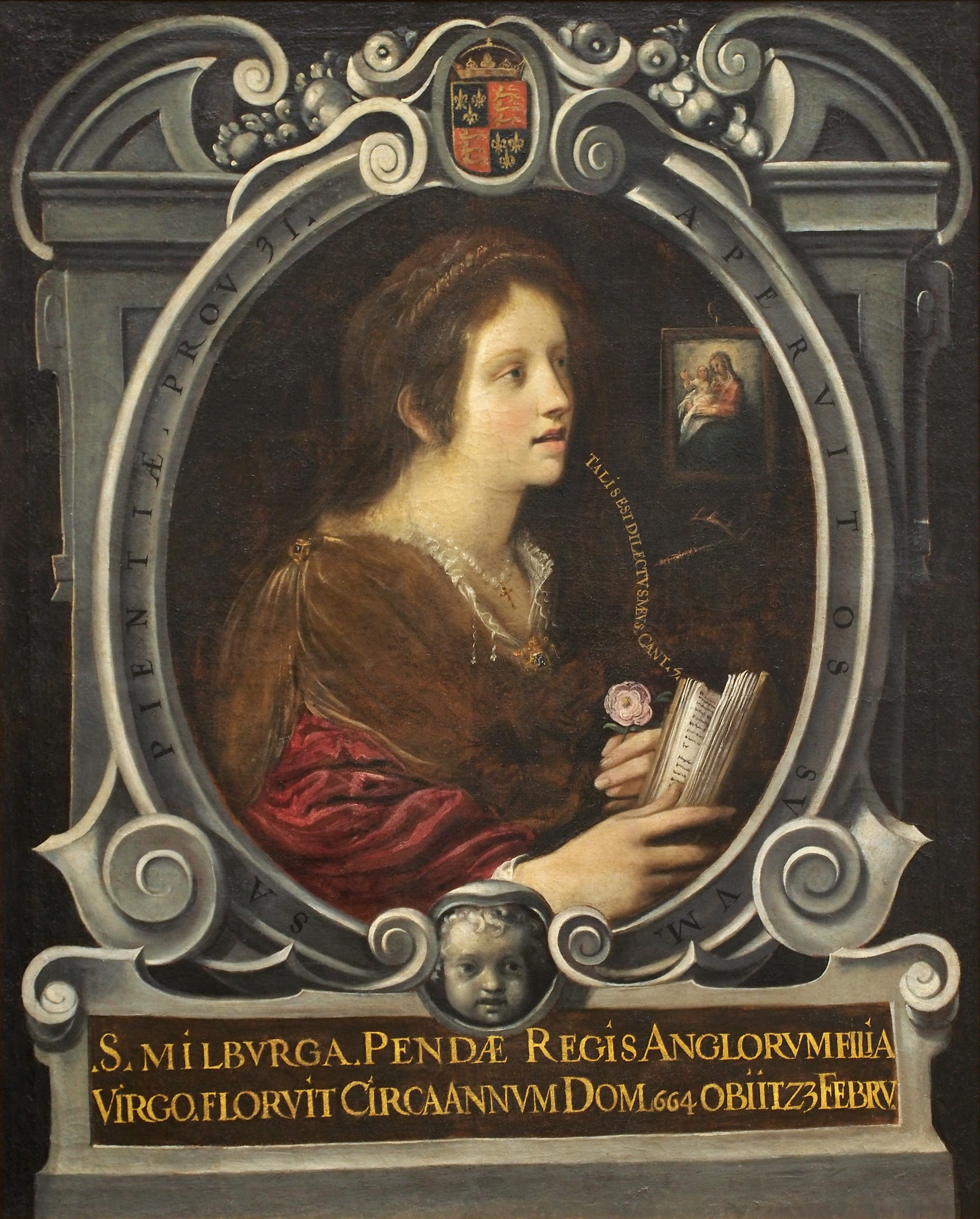
- Santa Milburga, c. 1605, by Juan de Roelas

Abbess
- Born: Unknown
- Died: 23 February 727
- Venerated in: Roman Catholic Church; Western Orthodoxy; Eastern Orthodox Church; Anglican Church
- Canonized: Pre-Congregation
- Feast: 23 February
- Patronage: birds

Mildburh (alternatively Milburga or Milburgh) (died 23 February 727) was the Benedictine abbess of Wenlock Priory. Her feast day is 23 February.

== Life ==
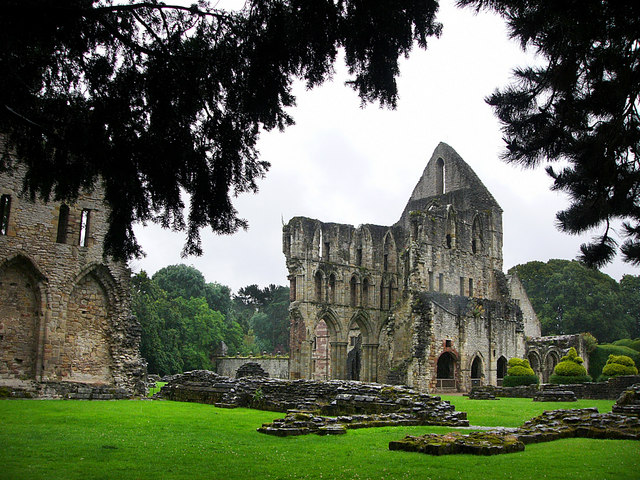
St Milburga's Priory, Much Wenlock

Mildburh was a daughter of Merewalh, King of the Mercian sub-kingdom of Magonsaete, and Domne Eafe. She was the older sister of Mildrith and Mildgytha. The three sisters have been likened to the three theological virtues: Milburh to faith, Mildgytha to hope, and Mildrith to charity.

Mildburh was sought in marriage by a neighboring prince, who resolved to have her for his wife, even at the cost of violence. Mildburh's escape took her across a river. The prince, in hot pursuit, was forced to desist when the river miraculously became so swollen that he was unable to ford.

Mildburh entered the Benedictine monastery of Wenlock, Shropshire (now known as Much Wenlock). The nunnery was founded with endowments by her father and her uncle, Wulfhere of Mercia, under the direction of a French Abbess, Liobinde of Chelles. Milburga eventually succeeded her in this office, and was installed as abbess by Theodore.

Educated in France, Mildburh was noted for her humility, and, according to popular stories, was endowed with the gift of healing and restored sight to the blind. She organised the evangelisation and pastoral care of south Shropshire.

She is said to have had a mysterious power over birds; they would avoid damaging the local crops when she asked them to. She was also associated with miracles, such as the creation of a spring and the miraculous growth of barley. One story relates that one morning she overslept and woke to find the sun shining on her. Her veil slipped but instead of falling to the ground was suspended on a sunbeam until she collected it.

She died on 23 February 727. Her feast day is thus 23 February. 23 February is now celebrated as Shropshire Day.

There is evidence that Saint Mildburh was syncretized with a pagan goddess. According to medievalist Pamela Berger, "this saint was chosen to fill the role of grain protectress in Shropshire when the ancient pagan protectress could no longer be venerated."

== Norman discovery ==
Her tomb was long venerated until her abbey was destroyed by invading Danes. After the Norman Conquest Cluniac monks built a monastery on the site – the ruins at Much Wenlock are those of the later house.

The Cluniac monks arrived at Wenlock from France, and on discovering what they believed to be the bones of Mildburh, began, in 1101, a process of establishing her relics as a pilgrimage destination for lepers. This was unpopular with the local English people, but successfully attracted people from France and Wales. It also encouraged a spate of written accounts of her life and miracles. A document entitled Miracula Inventionis Beatae Mylburge Virginis was produced at about this time, and possibly soon afterwards the well-known hagiographer Goscelin wrote his Vita Mildburga into which he incorporated a pre-existing account called 'Mildburh's Testimony', which purports to be a first-person account of her life.

She is named in some of the genealogies of the Kentish Royal Legend, which appear to draw on Anglo-Saxon material, but have no surviving manuscript copies that pre-date the 11th century. She is also one of the 89 saints listed with their locations in the 11th-century text written in Old English, known as the Secgan, or On the Resting-Places of the Saints.
