= Minster-in-Thanet =

Village in Kent, England

Minster
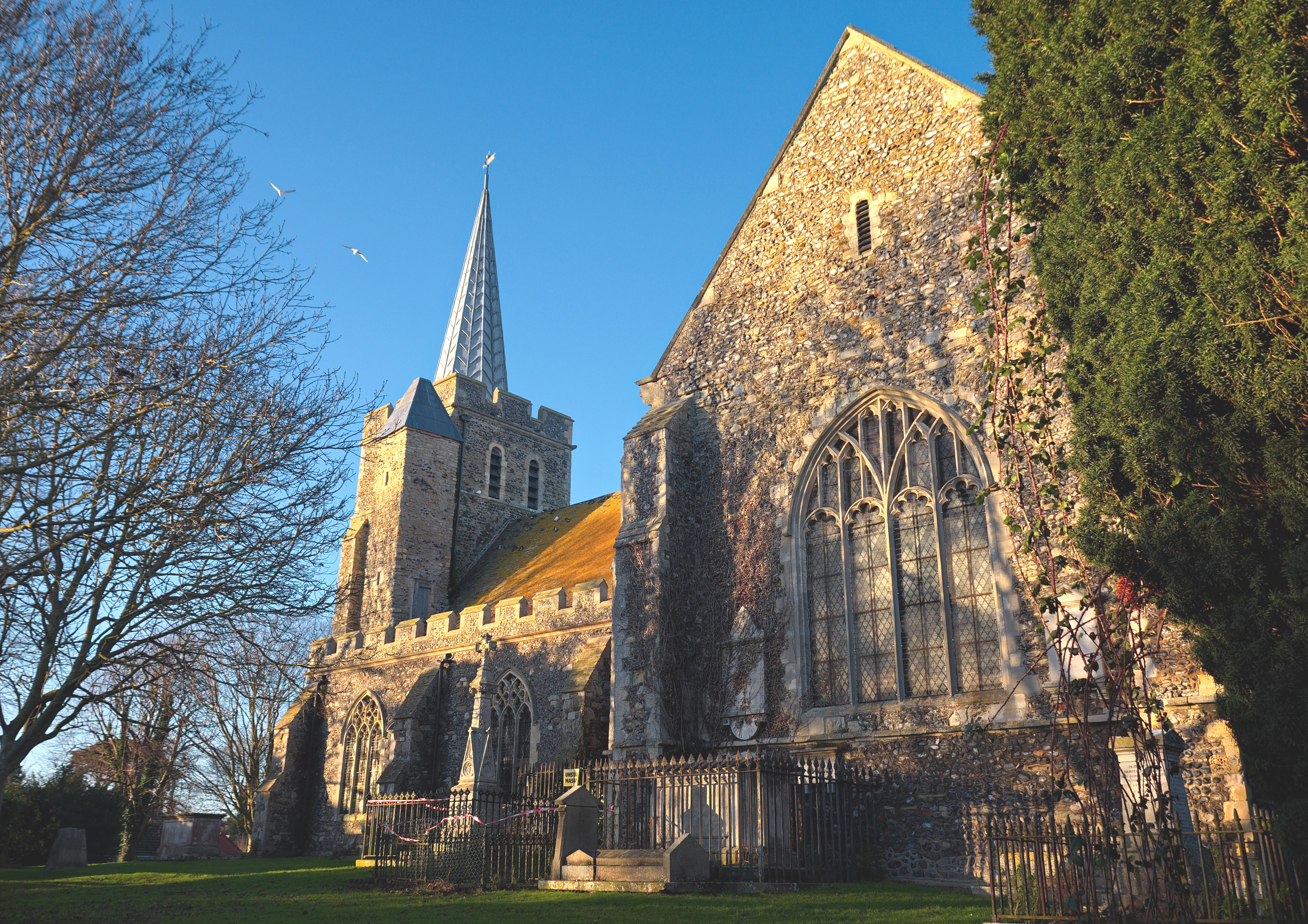
- Church of St Mary the Virgin, Minster-in-Thanet

- Location within Kent
- Population: 3,569 (2011)
- OS grid reference: TR308645
- Civil parish: Minster
- District: Thanet
- Shire county: Kent
- Region: South East
- Country: England
- Sovereign state: United Kingdom
- Post town: RAMSGATE
- Postcode district: CT12
- Dialling code: 01843
- Police: Kent
- Fire: Kent
- Ambulance: South East Coast
- UK Parliament: Herne Bay and Sandwich
- List of places UK England Kent 51.334°N 1.315°E Minster with Cursus Cerve (St Mildred’s Lynch)

Minster, also known as Minster-in-Thanet, is a village and civil parish in the Thanet District of Kent, England. It is the site of Minster in Thanet Priory. The village is west of Ramsgate (which is the post town) and to the north east of Canterbury; it lies just south west of Manston Airport and just north of the River Stour. Minster is also the "ancient capital of Thanet". At the 2011 Census the hamlet of Ebbsfleet was included.

== Toponymy ==
The name ultimately comes from the Medieval Latin monasterium, denoting the historical presence of an abbey or monastery; such names are common in England and indeed throughout Europe.

== History ==
Archaeology has shown a Bronze Age settlement at Minster-in-Thanet. The area became part of the Roman Empire under the emperor Claudius. Around 450AD, the Jutes arrived in the Minster area and established a settlement.

=== Anglo-Saxon ===
In 597 Augustine of Canterbury is said, by the Venerable Bede, to have landed with 40 men at nearby Ebbsfleet, in the parish of Minster-in-Thanet, before founding a monastery in Canterbury; a cross marks the spot of his landing.

Minster itself originally started as a monastic settlement in 670 AD. The buildings are still used as nunneries today. The first abbey in the village was founded by St Domneva, a widowed noblewoman, whose daughter St Mildred, is taken as the first abbess. The tradition is that Domneva was granted as much land as a hind could run over in a day, the hind remains the village emblem, see also Kentish Royal Legend. The boundary defined by the hind was known as Cursus Cerve or St Mildred’s Lynch. The abbey was extinguished by Viking raiding. The next abbess after St Mildred was St Edburga daughter of King Centwine of the West Saxons.

The third known abbess was Sigeburh, who was active around 762 AD and is known from the Secgan hagiography and from royal charters. In 761AD Offa, king of the Mercians, granted Sigeburh a toll-exemption which king Æthelbald had previously granted to Abbess Mildrith. Again in about 763 AD Eadberht II, king of Kent, granted the remission of toll on two ships at Sarre and on a third at Fordwich. It has been stated that in gaining these privileges, she may have been taking advantage of Æthelbald's political weakness.

Vikings attacked the surrounding area in 850 AD.

=== Norman ===
The parish church of St Mary-the-Virgin is largely Norman but with significant traces of earlier work, the problems of which are unresolved. The nave is impressive with five bays, and the crossing has an ancient chalk block vaulting. The chancel is Early English with later flying buttresses intended to halt the very obvious spread of the upper walls. There is a fine set of misericords reliably dated around 1400. The tower has a curious turret at its southeast corner that is locally referred to as a Saxon watch tower, but is built at least partly from Caen stone; it may be that it dates from the time of the Norman Conquest in 1066, but it is built in an antique style sometimes called Saxo-Norman. A doorway in the turret opens out some two metres above the present roof line.

The church was used by both the brethren of the second abbey, a dependency of St Augustine's Abbey in Canterbury, and as a parish church. Socket holes in the piers of the crossing suggest that, as well as a rood screen, there was a further screen dividing nave and crossing, such as still exists at Dunster in Somerset. This abbey surrendered during the dissolution of the monasteries in 1534.

=== Nineteenth century ===
The 1876 Ordnance Survey Great Britain County Series map shows a Methodist (Wesleyan) chapel in St Mildred's Road; on the 1898 OS map it has become Roman Catholic and been renamed "St Mildred's R.C. chapel", also being referred to as "St Mildred's church and presbytery". It later closed but as permission to demolish it and build houses on the site was denied in 2010, it was converted into a private residence.

=== Twentieth century ===
Minster Abbey is a house incorporating remains of the Anglo-Saxon abbey and alleged to be the oldest continuously inhabited house in England. It now houses the village's third religious community, a priory of Roman Catholic Benedictine sisters that is a daughter community of St. Walburg, Eichstätt in Bavaria. It was settled in 1937 by refugees fleeing Nazi Germany and continues to flourish as an international community. The Priory has the care of a relic of St Mildred that had been in the care of a church in Deventer in the Netherlands since the Reformation.

== Landscape ==
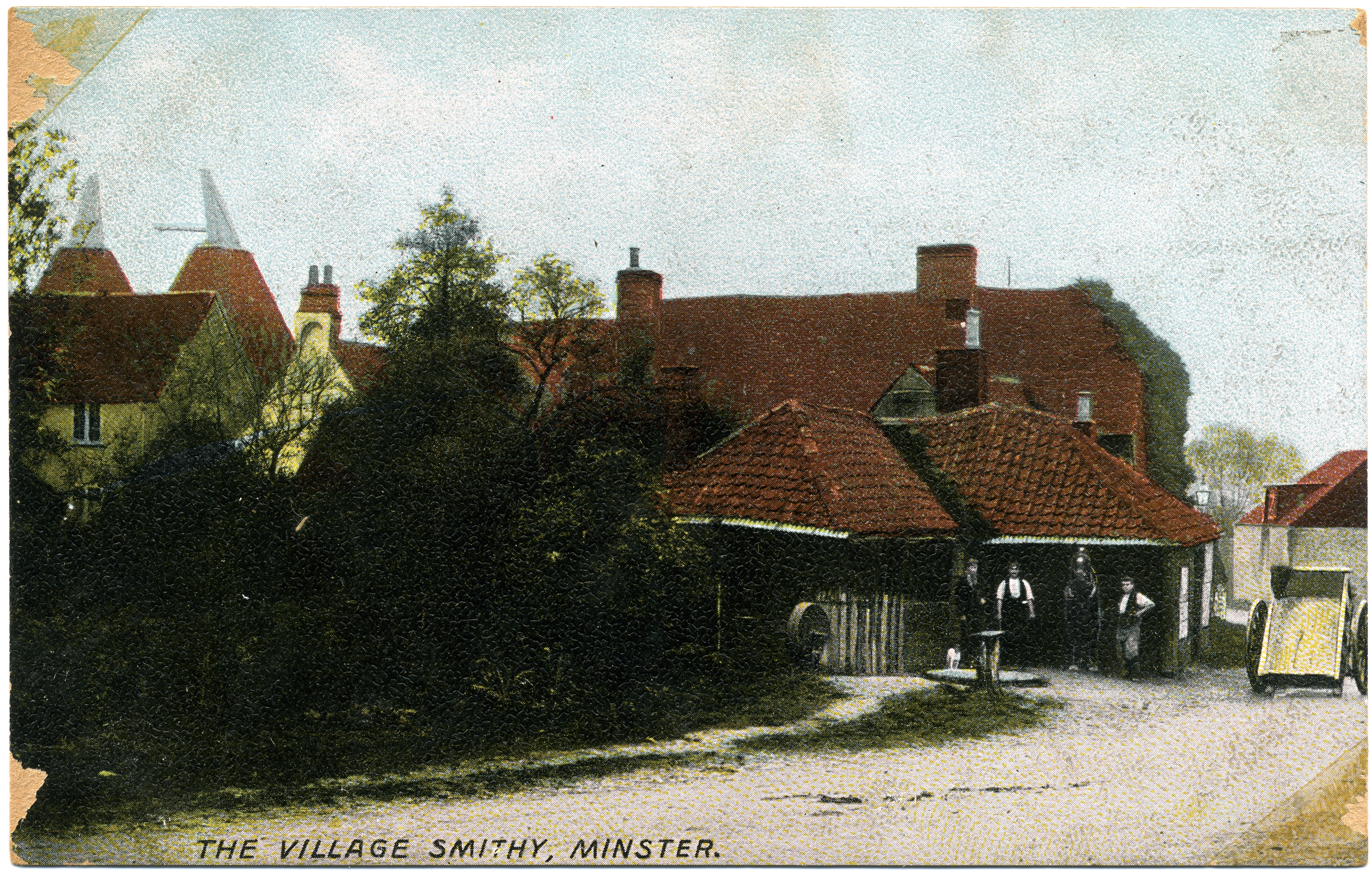
The smithy ca.1903, by Fred C. Palmer

Generally a flat landscape, the area's main features include marshes, farms and rivers. Thanet District Council has, however, assessed Minster Marshes, south of the village, as being unstable, and some areas of Minster, particularly in the south of the village, have suffered from flooding.

Land reclamation has had a strong history in Minster and Monkton, where the original reclamation was done by the monks themselves.

== Education ==
The Primary School is called "Minster Church of England Primary School", which caters for the village's population. As of 2022, there are 383 pupils attending the school.

== Transport ==
Minster railway station lies to the south of the village, on the line from Canterbury West to Ramsgate and on the junction to the Kent Coast Line.

Bus services are operated by Stagecoach South East.

== Military ==
Minster has a war memorial dedicated to those lost in World War I and World War II and this is located in St Mary's church.

In 2013, Minster hosted a memorial for Jean de Selys Longchamps, a Belgian fighter pilot who is buried in Minster cemetery. This event was hosted by Minster & Monkton Royal British Legion in conjunction with Minster Parish Council and was attended by such dignitaries as The Lord Lieutenant of Kent and the Chief of the Belgian Air Defense.

== Notable residents ==
- St Augustine of Canterbury is said by the Venerable Bede to have landed with 40 men at Ebbsfleet, within the parish of Minster, before beginning his mission in Canterbury, commemorated by St Augustine's Cross near Cliffsend.
- Richard Culmer, the infamous Puritan minister known locally as Blue Dick Culmer, was presented to the living but the people rejected him and his name - to this day - is still omitted from the role of incumbents in the church porch.

== See also ==
- Listed buildings in Minster-in-Thanet
