= Listed buildings in Minster-in-Thanet =

Historic structures in Kent, England

Minster-in-Thanet is a village and civil parish in the Thanet District of Kent, England. It contains 49 listed buildings that are recorded in the National Heritage List for England. Of these two are grade I, one is grade II* and 46 are grade II.

This list is based on the information retrieved online from Historic England.

== Key ==
Grade	Criteria
I	Buildings that are of exceptional interest
II*	Particularly important buildings of more than special interest
II	Buildings that are of special interest

== Listing ==
Name	Grade	Location	Type	Completed (Note: The date given is the date used by Historic England as significant for the initial building or that of an important part in the structure's description.)	Date designated	Grid ref. (Note: The grid reference is based on the British national grid reference system, sometimes known as OSGB36, used by the Ordnance Survey.) Geo-coordinates	Notes	Entry number (Note: The "List Entry Number" is a unique number assigned to each listed building and scheduled monument by Historic England.)	Image	Wikidata
Way House and Wayborough House, and Garden Wall Attached	II	And Garden Wall Attached, Wayborough Hill			4 April 1986	TR3202465258; 51°20′21″N 1°19′48″E		1266887	Upload Photo	Q26557343
Barn About 30 Metres North East of Minster Abbey	II	Bedlam Court Lane			13 October 1952	TR3124864417; 51°19′54″N 1°19′06″E		1223808	Upload Photo	Q26518051
Laundry About 15 Metres West of Minster Abbey	II	Bedlam Court Lane			6 February 1958	TR3117164342; 51°19′52″N 1°19′01″E		1267022	Upload Photo	Q26557464
Minster Abbey	I	Bedlam Court Lane	abbey		6 February 1958	TR3119964363; 51°19′53″N 1°19′03″E		1223807	Minster Abbey More images	Q17530175
Wall and Gate Lodge East of Minster Abbey	II	Bedlam Court Lane			7 October 1986	TR3126864372; 51°19′53″N 1°19′06″E		1266990	Upload Photo	Q26557435
1 and 3, Church Street	II	1 and 3, Church Street			7 October 1986	TR3114364323; 51°19′52″N 1°19′00″E		1267112	Upload Photo	Q26557538
5 and 7, Church Street	II	5 and 7, Church Street			7 October 1986	TR3113264324; 51°19′52″N 1°18′59″E		1223812	Upload Photo	Q26518055
Cast Iron Lamp Standard	II	Church Street			13 January 1999	TR3105864315; 51°19′51″N 1°18′56″E		1245058	Upload Photo	Q26537631
Cast Iron Lamp Standard Outside No.7 Church Street	II	Church Street			13 January 1999	TR3112064320; 51°19′52″N 1°18′59″E		1245059	Upload Photo	Q26537632
Church Cottage	II	Church Street			7 October 1986	TR3111564326; 51°19′52″N 1°18′58″E		1223811	Upload Photo	Q26518054
Church of Saint Mary	I	Church Street	church building		11 October 1963	TR3108964254; 51°19′49″N 1°18′57″E		1224116	Church of Saint Mary More images	Q17530180
Gate and Railings Adjoining and West of the White Horse	II	Church Street			7 October 1986	TR3111764304; 51°19′51″N 1°18′59″E		1223815	Upload Photo	Q26518058
Gates and Walls to Minster Abbey	II	Church Street			7 October 1986	TR3121164302; 51°19′51″N 1°19′03″E		1223810	Upload Photo	Q26518053
Group of Chest Tombs North of Church of Saint Mary	II	Church Street			7 October 1986	TR3109264276; 51°19′50″N 1°18′57″E		1223813	Upload Photo	Q26518056
No 11 and the Old Jezard's Bakery	II	11, Church Street			7 October 1986	TR3109664331; 51°19′52″N 1°18′58″E		1267000	Upload Photo	Q26557444
Railed Tomb Chests and Memorial Cross About 5 Metres South of Nave of Saint Mary's Church	II	Church Street			7 October 1986	TR3108464238; 51°19′49″N 1°18′57″E		1266958	Upload Photo	Q26557405
The Old School	II	Church Street			7 October 1986	TR3109764307; 51°19′51″N 1°18′58″E		1223814	Upload Photo	Q26518057
The Public Library (walsingham House)	II	15, Church Street			7 October 1986	TR3108364334; 51°19′52″N 1°18′57″E		1224100	Upload Photo	Q26518311
Saint Augustine's Cross	II	Cottington Road	high cross		15 May 1995	TR3403764157; 51°19′42″N 1°21′29″E		1266551	Saint Augustine's Cross More images	Q7592543
Durlock Lodge	II	Durlock			7 October 1986	TR3130464323; 51°19′51″N 1°19′08″E		1223818	Upload Photo	Q26518061
Garden Cottage and Garden Wall	II	Durlock, CT12 4HD			7 October 1986	TR3126464292; 51°19′50″N 1°19′06″E		1223817	Upload Photo	Q26518060
Little Durlock	II	Durlock			7 October 1986	TR3145564347; 51°19′52″N 1°19′16″E		1224214	Upload Photo	Q26518413
Barn About 30 Metres South East of Sevenscore House	II	Ebbsfleet Lane, Sevenscore			11 October 1963	TR3323664324; 51°19′49″N 1°20′48″E		1266813	Upload Photo	Q26557273
Farm Office About 10 Metres East of Sevenscore House	II	Ebbsfleet Lane, Sevenscore			7 October 1986	TR3321364362; 51°19′50″N 1°20′47″E		1266833	Upload Photo	Q26557292
Sevenscore House	II	Ebbsfleet Lane, Sevenscore			11 October 1963	TR3319464368; 51°19′50″N 1°20′46″E		1224327	Upload Photo	Q26518519
14, 16 and 18, High Street	II	14, 16 and 18, High Street			7 October 1986	TR3103464412; 51°19′55″N 1°18′55″E		1224295	Upload Photo	Q26518489
53, High Street	II	53, High Street, CT12 4BT			7 October 1986	TR3106464630; 51°20′02″N 1°18′57″E		1223819	Upload Photo	Q26518062
Cast Iron Lamp Standard Opposite Entrance to Car Park	II	High Street			13 January 1999	TR3104664366; 51°19′53″N 1°18′55″E		1245057	Upload Photo	Q26537630
Hawthorne Lodge	II	59, High Street			17 November 1975	TR3102364666; 51°20′03″N 1°18′55″E		1224293	Upload Photo	Q26518487
Inglewood	II	3 and 5, High Street			20 December 1977	TR3105464395; 51°19′54″N 1°18′55″E		1267113	Upload Photo	Q26557539
The Bell Inn	II	High Street	pub		11 October 1963	TR3104164332; 51°19′52″N 1°18′55″E		1223820	The Bell Inn More images	Q26518063
The Elms, 42 High Street	II	42 High Street, Minster-in-thanet, CT12 4BT			7 October 1986	TR3101764593; 51°20′00″N 1°18′54″E		1223821	Upload Photo	Q26518064
126, Monkton Road	II	126, Monkton Road			7 October 1986	TR2954464872; 51°20′12″N 1°17′39″E		1266879	Upload Photo	Q26557336
Eden Hall	II	Monkton Road			7 October 1986	TR3052564733; 51°20′06″N 1°18′29″E		1266880	Upload Photo	Q26557337
Hoo Farm	II	147, Monkton Road			11 October 1963	TR2968164900; 51°20′12″N 1°17′46″E		1224315	Upload Photo	Q26518508
Wall and Gates About 10 Metres South of Hoo Farmhouse	II	Monkton Road			7 October 1986	TR2968064882; 51°20′12″N 1°17′46″E		1223822	Upload Photo	Q26518065
The Old Vicarage	II	Saint Mildred's Road			7 October 1986	TR3094264270; 51°19′50″N 1°18′49″E		1224326	Upload Photo	Q26518518
Sheriff's Court Farmhouse	II	Sheriff's Court Lane			7 October 1986	TR2955464319; 51°19′54″N 1°17′38″E		1224334	Upload Photo	Q26518524
Thanet House	II	Station Road			7 October 1986	TR3102464281; 51°19′50″N 1°18′54″E		1224335	Upload Photo	Q26518525
Number 2, the White Horse, Including Lamp Bracket and Hand Pump	II	The White Horse, Including Lamp Bracket And Hand Pump, 2, Church Street			7 October 1986	TR3113264296; 51°19′51″N 1°18′59″E		1266931	Upload Photo	Q26557380
Chapel House	II	Thorne Hill			11 October 1963	TR3342064972; 51°20′09″N 1°20′59″E		1224336	Upload Photo	Q26518526
Bay Tree Cottage	II	17, Tothill Street			7 October 1986	TR3100064846; 51°20′09″N 1°18′54″E		1224499	Upload Photo	Q26518678
Former Prospect Inn	II	Tothill Street, Ramsgate, CT12 4AY			3 May 1990	TR3101065730; 51°20′37″N 1°18′56″E		1224448	Upload Photo	Q26518628
Psalm Cottage	II	Tothill Street			7 October 1986	TR3098364916; 51°20′11″N 1°18′53″E		1224337	Upload Photo	Q26518527
Rose Cottage	II	30, Tothill Street			7 October 1986	TR3097964908; 51°20′11″N 1°18′53″E		1266885	Upload Photo	Q26557341
Watchester Farmhouse	II	Watchester Lane			7 October 1986	TR3064164244; 51°19′50″N 1°18′34″E		1224338	Upload Photo	Q26518528
Rose Cottage and Pansy Cottage	II	Way Hill			25 March 1975	TR3206364931; 51°20′10″N 1°19′49″E		1224339	Upload Photo	Q26518529
Tudor Cottage	II	Way Hill			7 October 1986	TR3204564953; 51°20′11″N 1°19′48″E		1224545	Upload Photo	Q26518719
Wayborough Manor	II*	Wayborough Hill			11 October 1963	TR3195465055; 51°20′14″N 1°19′43″E		1224593	Upload Photo	Q17546646

== See also ==
- Grade I listed buildings in Kent
- Grade II* listed buildings in Kent

== Sources ==
- Newman, John (2013) [1969], Kent: North-East and East, The Buildings of England, New Haven and London: Yale University Press, ISBN 978-0-300-18506-5
