= Merewalh =

Merewalh (sometimes given as Merwal or Merewald was a sub-king of the Magonsæte, a western cadet kingdom of Mercia thought to have been located in Herefordshire and Shropshire. Merewalh is thought to have lived in the mid to late 7th century, having acceded the throne during the time of Penda of Mercia, who, the Anglo-Saxon Chronicle : implies, was his father. Though Merewalh's name implies that may have been a Briton. It is possible that Merewalh was a British leader, rewarded by Penda for his aid in war, perhaps at the Battle of Maserfelth. We know nothing of the origins of his first wife, who could have been a relative of Penda. A British origin might explain his control of lands around Leominster, where no evidence of early settlement by pagan Anglo-Saxons is to be found.

A.D. 656. This year was Peada slain; and Wulfhere, son of Penda, succeeded to the kingdom of the Mercians. In his time waxed the abbey of Medhamsted very rich, which his brother had begun. The king loved it much, for the love of his brother Peada, and for the love of his wed-brother Oswy, and for the love of Saxulf the abbot. He said, therefore, that he would dignify and honour it by the counsel of his brothers, Ethelred and Merwal; and by the counsel of his sisters, Kyneburga and Kyneswitha; and by the counsel of the archbishop, who was called Deus-dedit; and by the counsel of all his peers, learned and lewd, that in his kingdom were.

The name Merewalh signifies "Famous Foreigner" or "Celebrated Welshman", possibly indicating that he, and perhaps even Penda's dynasty, was of Celtic origin. During his lifetime, Merewalh converted to Christianity in about 660, founding Leominster Priory. Merewalh married Saint Ermenburga, having several children (see below). He died sometime between 670 and 685, being succeeded by his son Merchelm.

== Kentish royal legend ==
The Kentish royal legend makes Merewald a son of king Penda. He married the Kentish princess, Domne Eafe, and their offspring were the Saints Mildburh, Mildrið and Mildgið

Their son Merefin, described in the legend as "the holy child" (þæt halige cild), died as a youth (Þonne wæs Sancte merefin þæt halige cild on iogoðhade to gode gelæd); described by Florence of Worcester as "a youth of eminent piety."
