= Mildgyth =

Anglo Saxon abess

Saint Mildgyth

Abbess
- Born: Unknown
- Died: 676
- Venerated in: Roman Catholic Church, Anglican Church, Eastern Orthodox Church
- Canonized: Pre-Congregation
- Feast: 17 January

Saint Mildgyth (or Mildgytha) (Old English: Mildgȳð) (died 676) was the youngest daughter of Merewalh, king of Mercia and Saint Eormenburh. She was the youngest sister of Saint Mildburh of Wenlock and Saint Mildrith. The three sisters have been likened to the three theological virtues: Mildburh to faith, Mildgyth to hope, and Mildrith to charity.

She was a Benedictine nun and later abbess of a Northumbrian convent. All that is known of St Mildgytha was that she was a nun and that “miraculous powers were often exhibited” at her tomb in Northumbria. She seems to have died long before her sisters, while still quite young, which may account for so little mention of her.

Her feast day is 17 January.
