= Eormenred of Kent =

Eormenred

King of Kent
- Reign: 640–before 664
- Predecessor: Eadbald
- Successor: Eorcenberht
- Died: before 664
- Spouse: Oslafa
- Issue: Domne Eafe; Æthelred; Æthelberht; Eormengyth
- Father: Eadbald
- Mother: Emma

Eormenred (died before 664) was a member of the royal family of the Kingdom of Kent, who is described as king in some texts. There is no contemporary evidence for Eormenred, but he is mentioned in later hagiographies, and his existence is considered possible by scholars.

In the Kentish royal legend, Eormenred is described as a son of Eadbald, who was King of Kent from 616 to 640, and his second wife Emma, who may have been a Frankish princess. "Eormenred" is a name of Frankish origin, as is that of his brother, Eorcenberht. Before his father's death, Eormenred married Oslava and had at least four children, possibly five: two sons, Æthelred and Æthelberht, and two daughters, Domne Eafe and Eormengyth. Eormenburh may be a further daughter, or a synonym for Domne Eafe.

Following his father's death, Eorcenberht ascended to the throne. The description of Eormenred as king may indicate that he ruled jointly with his brother or, alternatively, that he held a subordinate position while being granted the title of "king". He died before his brother, and is said to have left his two sons in Eorcenberht's care. However, after Eorcenberht himself died, his son and successor Ecgberht arranged for the murder of these potential rival claimants to the throne, who were later venerated as saints. Domne Eafe was not killed, and was subsequently granted land on Thanet by Ecgberht for a monastery, as penance for the murder of her brothers. This land is stated to have previously belonged to Eormenred.
