= Emma of Austrasia =

Austrasian princess

Emma (fl. early seventh century) was a Frankish woman, possibly a Merovingian, who married Eadbald of Kent.

Emma was a daughter of the Frankish king Theudebert II, who ruled Austrasia from 595 to 612. He had previously shown little interest in the Kingdom of Kent, but Gregory the Great had written to him in 601, encouraging him to back Paulinus and Mellitus' missionary campaign, which was to be based in Canterbury.

In 616, Eadbald came to the throne of Kent. His mother appears to have been Bertha, a Merovingian princess. He came to the throne following traditional Germanic religion, but was converted and gave up his first wife who, as his stepmother, was not considered acceptable by the Christian church. This development appears to have initiated closer relations between Kent and the Frankish kingdom. Eadbald made a second marriage, to a Christian named Emma, who is identified in the annals of St Augustine's Abbey as the daughter of a Frankish king - implying Emma, daughter of Theudebert.

However, S. E. Kelly, writing in the Oxford Dictionary of National Biography, holds that the belief that Eadbald married a daughter of Theudebert is the result of confusion between him and Adaloald, King of the Lombards. Kelly gives more credence to a suggestion that Eadbald's wife was the daughter of Erchinoald, the mayor of the palace in the Frankish kingdom of Neustria from 641 to 658.

Christian Settipani mentions another plausible possibility. He notes that in 618, the year of the marriage, the only king of the Franks was Chlothar II and that one of Emma's grandchildren bears the similar sounding name Hlothere, concluding that Emma was a daughter of Chlothar II and his first wife Haldetrude.

The Emma who married Eadbald had, as described in the Kentish Royal Legend, three children: Eormenred, Eorcenberht and Eanswith. She is known to have died in 642, two years after her husband. She was buried alongside Eadbald in the Church of St Mary, which he had built in the precincts of the monastery of St Peter and St Paul in Canterbury (a church later incorporated within the Norman edifice of St Augustine's). At that time, her relics were probably translated along with Eadbald's for reburial in the south transept ca. A.D. 1087.

Preceded by Unknown	Queen Consort of Kent; 610s–640	Succeeded by Seaxburh of Ely
