= Edburga of Minster-in-Thanet =

Princess and abbess in Wessex

Saint Edburga of Minster-in-Thanet

Abbess
- Born: England
- Died: 13 December 759; Minster-in-Thanet
- Venerated in: Eastern Orthodox Church; Roman Catholic Church; Church of England
- Feast: 19 November

Saint Edburga of Minster-in-Thanet (also known as Eadburh and Bugga) was a princess of Wessex, and abbess of Minster-in-Thanet. She is regarded as a saint.

== Life ==
Edburga was the only daughter of King Centwine and Queen Engyth of Wessex. According to Stephen of Ripon, Engyth was a sister of Queen Iurminburh, second wife of King Ecgfrith of Northumbria. Centwine was not a Christian, but towards the end of his reign, converted and became a monk.

Edburga was a friend and student of Saint Mildrith, abbess of Minster-in-Thanet. She was reputed to be zealous in the pursuit of knowledge. In 716, Edburga became a Benedictine nun at the abbey. She corresponded with Saint Boniface and Lullus.

Between 718 and 720 her mother wrote to Boniface and soon after, in 720, Edburga herself wrote to him, sending him fifty shillings and an altar cloth.

In 716, Boniface addresses to her a letter containing the famous Vision of the Monk of Wenlock.

She succeeded Mildrith as the abbess around 733, and presided over about seventy nuns. During her time as an abbess she was able to secure royal charters for the abbey, as well as having a new church (Ss. Peter and Paul) built there, to provide a shrine for the relics of St Mildrith.
