= Æthelberht of Kent =

King of Kent from 589 to 616

Saint Æthelberht
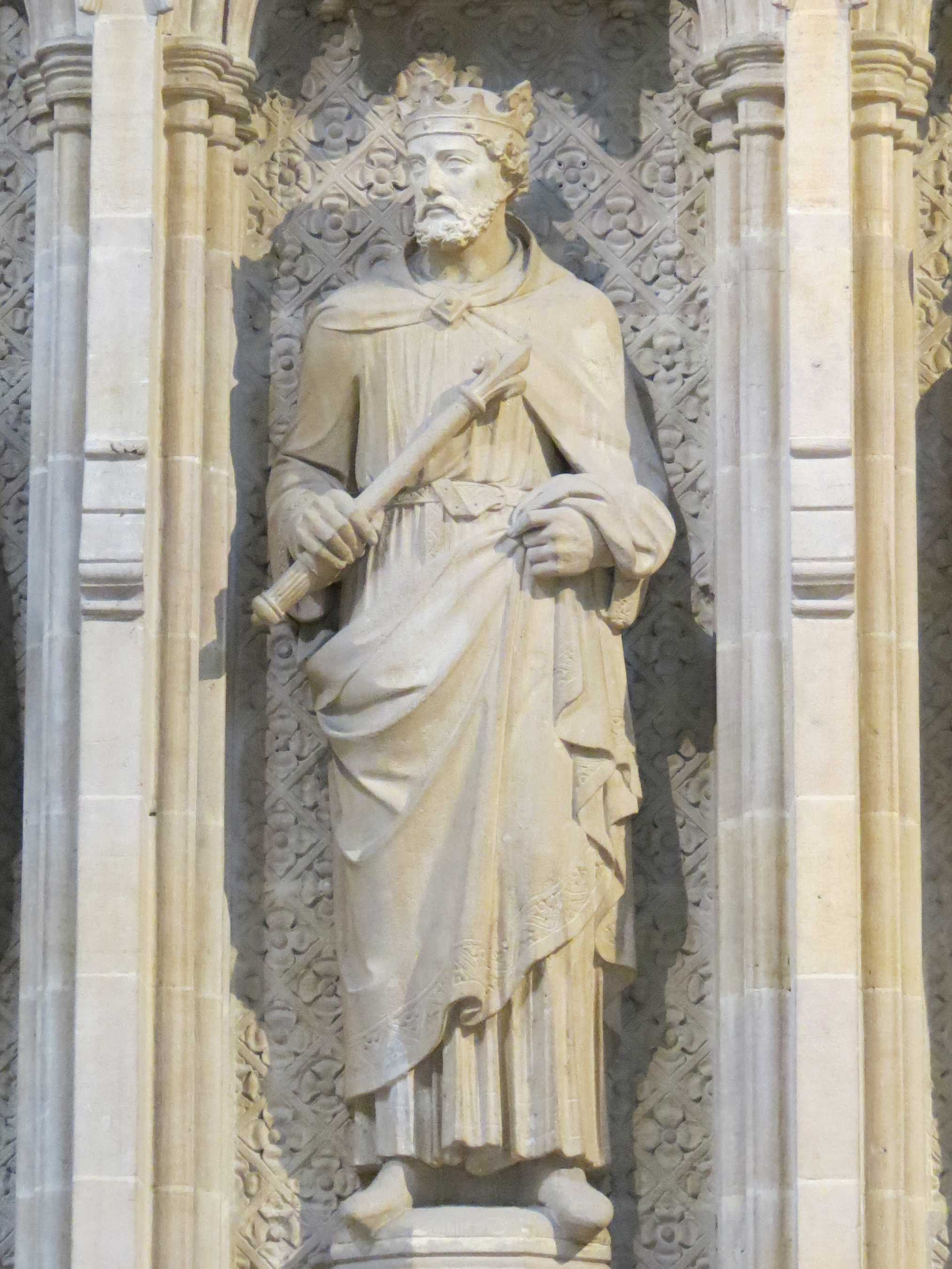
- Statue of Æthelberht; Interior of Rochester Cathedral

King of Kent
- Reign: c. 589 – 616
- Predecessor: Eormenric
- Successor: Eadbald
- Born: c. 550
- Died: 24 February 616 (aged 65–66)
- Burial: St Augustine's Abbey
- Consort: Bertha of Kent
- Issue: Eadbald; Æthelburg; Æðelwald
- House: Kent
- Father: Eormenric
- Religion: Christianity prev. Anglo-Saxon paganism

Æthelberht (Note: also Æthelbert, Aethelberht, Aethelbert or Ethelbert) (/ˈæθəlbərt/; Old English: Æðelberht [ˈæðelberˠxt]; c. 550 – 24 February 616) was King of Kent from about 589 until his death. The eighth-century monk Bede, in his Ecclesiastical History of the English People, lists him as the third king to hold imperium over other Anglo-Saxon kingdoms. In the late-ninth-century Anglo-Saxon Chronicle, he is referred to as a bretwalda, or "Britain-ruler". He was the first Anglo-Saxon king to convert to Christianity.

Æthelberht was the son of Eormenric, succeeding him as king, according to the Chronicle. He married Bertha, the Christian daughter of Charibert I, king of the Franks, thus building an alliance with the most powerful state in contemporary Western Europe; the marriage probably took place before he came to the throne. Bertha's influence may have led to Pope Gregory I's decision to send Augustine as a missionary from Rome. Augustine landed on the Isle of Thanet in east Kent in 597. Shortly thereafter, Æthelberht converted to Christianity, churches were established, and wider-scale conversion to Christianity began in the kingdom. He provided the new church with land in Canterbury, thus helping to establish one of the foundation stones of English Christianity.

Æthelberht's law for Kent, the earliest written code in any Germanic language, instituted a complex system of fines; the law code is preserved in the Textus Roffensis. Kent was rich, with strong trade ties to the Continent, and Æthelberht may have instituted royal control over trade. Coinage probably began circulating in Kent during his reign for the first time since the Anglo-Saxon settlement.

He is regarded as a saint for his leading role in establishing Christianity among the Anglo-Saxons. His feast day was originally 24 February but was changed to 25 February in some Churches. In the Catholic Church, his feast day is currently celebrated on 24 February.

== Historical context ==
The state of Anglo-Saxon England at the time Æthelberht came to the throne of Kent

In the fifth century, raids on Britain by continental peoples had developed into full-scale migrations. The newcomers are known to have included Angles, Saxons, Jutes and Frisians, and there is evidence of other groups as well. These groups captured territory in the east and south of England, but at about the end of the fifth century, a British victory at the battle of Mount Badon (Mons Badonicus) halted the Anglo-Saxon advance for fifty years. From about 550, however, the British began to lose ground once more, and within twenty-five years it appears that control of almost all of southern England was in the hands of the invaders.

Anglo-Saxons probably conquered Kent before Mons Badonicus. There is both documentary and archaeological evidence that Kent was primarily colonised by Jutes, from the southern part of the Jutland peninsula. According to legend, the brothers Hengist and Horsa landed in 449 as mercenaries for a British king, Vortigern. After a rebellion over pay and Horsa's death in battle, Hengist established the Kingdom of Kent. Some historians now think the underlying story of a rebelling mercenary force may be accurate; most now date the founding of the kingdom of Kent to the middle of the fifth-century, which is consistent with the legend. (Note: There is disagreement about the extent to which the legend can be treated as fact. For example, Barbara Yorke says "Recent detailed studies [...] have confirmed that these accounts are largely mythic and that any reliable oral tradition which they may have embodied has been lost in the conventions of the origin-legend format", but Richard Fletcher says of Hengist that "there is no good reason for doubting his existence", and James Campbell adds that "although the origins of such annals are deeply mysterious, and suspect, they cannot be simply discarded".) This early date, only a few decades after the departure of the Romans, also suggests that more of Roman civilisation may have survived into Anglo-Saxon rule in Kent than in other areas.

Overlordship was a central feature of Anglo-Saxon politics which began before Æthelberht's time; kings were described as overlords as late as the ninth century. The Anglo-Saxon invasion may have involved military coordination of different groups within the invaders, with a leader who had authority over many different groups; Ælle of Sussex may have been such a leader. Once the new states began to form, conflicts among them began. Tribute from dependents could lead to wealth. A weaker state also might ask or pay for the protection of a stronger neighbour against a warlike third state.

Sources for this period in Kentish history include the Ecclesiastical History of the English People, written in 731 by Bede, a Northumbrian monk. Bede was interested primarily in England's Christianisation. Since Æthelberht was the first Anglo-Saxon king to convert to Christianity, Bede provides more substantial information about him than about any earlier king. One of Bede's correspondents was Albinus, abbot of the monastery of St. Peter and St. Paul (subsequently renamed St. Augustine's) in Canterbury. The Anglo-Saxon Chronicle, a collection of annals assembled c. 890 in the kingdom of Wessex, mentions several events in Kent during Æthelberht's reign. Further mention of events in Kent occurs in the late-sixth-century history of the Franks by Gregory of Tours. This is the earliest surviving source to mention any Anglo-Saxon kingdom. Some of Pope Gregory the Great's letters concern the mission of St. Augustine to Kent in 597; these letters also mention the state of Kent and its relationships with neighbours. Other sources include regnal lists of the kings of Kent and early charters (land grants by kings to their followers or to the church). Although no originals survive from Æthelberht's reign, later copies exist. A law code from Æthelberht's reign also survives.

== Ancestry, accession and chronology ==
According to Bede, Æthelberht was descended directly from Hengist. Bede gives the line of descent as follows: "Ethelbert was son of Irminric, son of Octa, and after his grandfather Oeric, surnamed Oisc, the kings of the Kentish folk are commonly known as Oiscings. The father of Oeric was Hengist." An alternative form of this genealogy, found in the Historia Brittonum among other places, reverses the position of Octa and Oisc in the lineage. The first of these names that can be placed historically with reasonable confidence is Æthelberht's father, whose name now usually is spelled Eormenric. The only direct written reference to Eormenric is in Kentish genealogies, but Gregory of Tours does mention that Æthelberht's father was the king of Kent; though Gregory gives no date. Eormenric's name provides a hint of connections to the kingdom of the Franks, across the English channel; the element "Eormen" was rare in names of the Anglo-Saxon aristocracy, but much more common among Frankish nobles. One other member of Æthelberht's family is known: his sister, Ricole, who is recorded by both Bede and the Anglo-Saxon Chronicle as the mother of Sæberht, king of the East Saxons (i.e., Essex).

The dates of Æthelberht's birth and accession to the throne of Kent are both matters of debate. Bede, the earliest source to give dates, is thought to have drawn his information from correspondence with Albinus. Bede states that when Æthelberht died in 616 he had reigned for fifty-six years, placing his accession in 560. Bede also says that Æthelberht died twenty-one years after his baptism. Augustine's mission from Rome is known to have arrived in 597, and according to Bede, it was this mission that converted Æthelberht. Hence Bede's dates are inconsistent. The Anglo-Saxon Chronicle, an important source for early dates, is inconsistent with Bede and also has inconsistencies among different manuscript versions. Putting together the different dates in the Chronicle for birth, death and length of reign, it appears that Æthelberht's reign was thought to have been either 560–616 or 565–618 but that the surviving sources have confused the two traditions.

It is possible that Æthelberht was converted to Christianity before Augustine's arrival. Æthelberht's wife was a Christian and brought a Frankish bishop with her, to attend her at court, so Æthelberht would have had knowledge of Christianity before the mission reached Kent. It also is possible that Bede had the date of Æthelberht's death wrong; if, in fact, Æthelberht died in 618, this would be consistent with his baptism in 597, which is in accord with the tradition that Augustine converted the king within a year of his arrival.

Gregory of Tours, in his Historia Francorum, writes that Bertha, daughter of Charibert I, king of the Franks, married the son of the king of Kent. Bede says that Æthelberht received Bertha "from her parents". If Bede is interpreted literally, the marriage would have had to take place before 567, when Charibert died. The traditions for Æthelberht's reign, then, would imply that Æthelberht married Bertha before either 560 or 565.

The extreme length of Æthelberht's reign also has been regarded with skepticism by historians; it has been suggested that he died in the fifty-sixth year of his life, rather than the fifty-sixth year of his reign. This would place the year of his birth approximately at 560, and he would not then have been able to marry until the mid 570s. According to Gregory of Tours, Charibert was king when he married Ingoberg, Bertha's mother, which places that marriage no earlier than 561. It therefore is unlikely that Bertha was married much before about 580. These later dates for Bertha and Æthelberht also solve another possible problem: Æthelberht's daughter, Æthelburh, seems likely to have been Bertha's child, but the earlier dates would have Bertha aged sixty or so at Æthelburh's likely birthdate using the early dates.

Gregory, however, also says that he thinks that Ingoberg was seventy years old in 589; and this would make her about forty when she married Charibert. This is possible, but seems unlikely, especially as Charibert seems to have had a preference for younger women, again according to Gregory's account. This would imply an earlier birth date for Bertha. On the other hand, Gregory refers to Æthelberht at the time of his marriage to Bertha simply as "a man of Kent", and in the 589 passage concerning Ingoberg's death, which was written in about 590 or 591, he refers to Æthelberht as "the son of the king of Kent". If this does not simply reflect Gregory's ignorance of Kentish affairs, which seems unlikely given the close ties between Kent and the Franks, then some assert that Æthelberht's reign cannot have begun before 589.

While all of the contradictions above cannot be reconciled, the most probable dates that may be drawn from available data place Æthelberht's birth at approximately 560 and, perhaps, his marriage to Bertha at 580. His reign is most likely to have begun in 589 or 590.

== Kingship of Kent ==
The later history of Kent shows clear evidence of a system of joint kingship, with the kingdom being divided into east Kent and west Kent, although it appears that there generally was a dominant king. This evidence is less clear for the earlier period, but there are early charters, known to be forged, which nevertheless imply that Æthelberht ruled as joint king with his son, Eadbald. It may be that Æthelberht was king of east Kent and Eadbald became king of west Kent; the east Kent king seems generally to have been the dominant ruler later in Kentish history. Whether or not Eadbald became a joint king with Æthelberht, there is no question that Æthelberht had authority throughout the kingdom.

The division into two kingdoms is most likely to date back to the sixth century; east Kent may have conquered west Kent and preserved the institutions of kingship as a subkingdom. This was a common pattern in Anglo-Saxon England, as the more powerful kingdoms absorbed their weaker neighbours. An unusual feature of the Kentish system was that only sons of kings appeared to be legitimate claimants to the throne, although this did not eliminate all strife over the succession.

The main towns of the two kingdoms were Rochester, for west Kent, and Canterbury, for east Kent. Bede does not state that Æthelberht had a palace in Canterbury, but he does refer to Canterbury as Æthelberht's "metropolis", and it is clear that it is Æthelberht's seat.

== Relations with the Franks ==
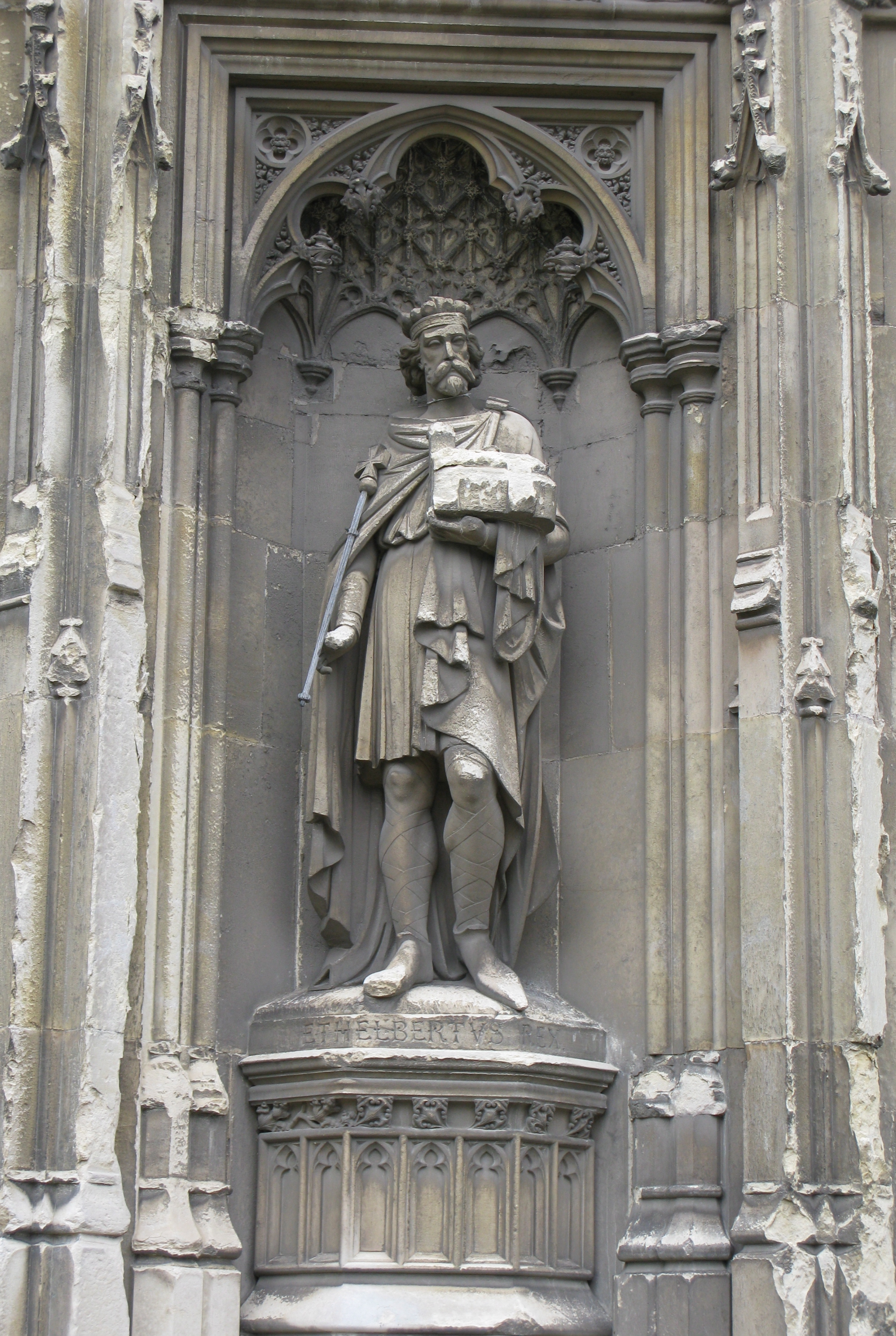
Sculpture of Æthelberht on Canterbury Cathedral in England

There are many indications of close relations between Kent and the Franks. Æthelberht's marriage to Bertha certainly connected the two courts, although not as equals: the Franks would have thought of Æthelberht as an under-king. There is no record that Æthelberht ever accepted a continental king as his overlord and, as a result, historians are divided on the true nature of the relationship. Evidence for an explicit Frankish overlordship of Kent comes from a letter written by Pope Gregory the Great to Theuderic, king of Burgundy, and Theudebert, king of Austrasia. The letter concerned Augustine's mission to Kent in 597, and in it Gregory says that he believes "that you wish your subjects in every respect to be converted to that faith in which you, their kings and lords, stand". It may be that this is a papal compliment, rather than a description of the relationship between the kingdoms. It also has been suggested that Liudhard, Bertha's chaplain, was intended as a representative of the Frankish church in Kent, which also could be interpreted as evidence of overlordship.

A possible reason for the willingness of the Franks to connect themselves with the Kentish court is the fact that a Frankish king, Chilperic I, is recorded as having conquered a people known as the Euthiones during the mid-sixth century. If, as seems likely from the name, these people were the continental remnants of the Jutish invaders of Kent, then it may be that the marriage was intended as a unifying political move, reconnecting different branches of the same people. Another perspective on the marriage may be gained by considering that it is likely that Æthelberht was not yet king at the time he and Bertha were wed: it may be that Frankish support for him, acquired via the marriage, was instrumental in gaining the throne for him.

Regardless of the political relationship between Æthelberht and the Franks, there is abundant evidence of strong connections across the English Channel. There was a luxury trade between Kent and the Franks, and burial artefacts found include clothing, drink, and weapons that reflect Frankish cultural influence. The Kentish burials have a greater range of imported goods than those of the neighbouring Anglo-Saxon regions, which is not surprising given Kent's easier access to trade across the English Channel. In addition, the grave goods are both richer and more numerous in Kentish graves, implying that material wealth was derived from that trade. Frankish influences also may be detected in the social and agrarian organisation of Kent. Other cultural influences may be seen in the burials as well, so it is not necessary to presume that there was direct settlement by the Franks in Kent.

== Rise to dominance ==
=== Bretwalda ===
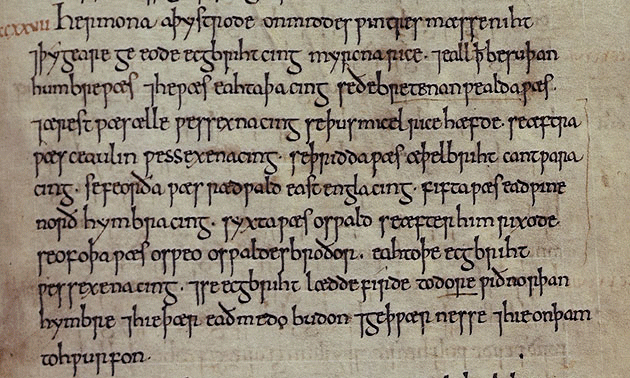
The entry for 827 in the [C] ms. (one of the Abingdon manuscripts) of the Anglo-Saxon Chronicle, listing the eight bretwaldas; Æthelberht's name, spelled "Æþelbriht", is the second-to-last word on the fifth line

In his Ecclesiastical History, Bede includes his list of seven kings who held imperium over the other kingdoms south of the Humber. The usual translation for imperium is "overlordship". Bede names Æthelberht as the third on the list, after Ælle of Sussex and Ceawlin of Wessex. The anonymous annalist who composed one of the versions of the Anglo-Saxon Chronicle repeated Bede's list of seven kings in a famous entry under the year 827, with one additional king, Egbert of Wessex. The Chronicle also records that these kings held the title bretwalda, or "Britain-ruler". The exact meaning of bretwalda has been the subject of much debate; it has been described as a term "of encomiastic poetry", but there also is evidence that it implied a definite role of military leadership.

The prior bretwalda, Ceawlin, is recorded by the Anglo-Saxon Chronicle as having fought Æthelberht in 568 at a place called "Wibbandun" ("Wibba's Mount") whose location has not been identified. The entry states that Æthelberht lost the battle and was driven back to Kent. Comparison of the entries concerning the West Saxons in this section of the Chronicle with the West Saxon Genealogical Regnal List shows that their dating is unreliable: Ceawlin's reign is more likely to have been approximately 581–588, rather than 560–592 as claimed in the Chronicle.

At some point Ceawlin lost his overlordship, perhaps after a battle at Fethan leag, thought to have been in Oxfordshire, which the Chronicle dates to 584, some eight years before he was deposed in 592 (again using the Chronicle's unreliable dating). Æthelberht certainly was a dominant ruler by 601, when Gregory the Great wrote to him: Gregory urges Æthelberht to spread Christianity among those kings and peoples subject to him, implying some level of overlordship. If the battle of Wibbandun was fought c. 590, as has been suggested, then Æthelberht must have gained his position as overlord at some time in the 590s. This dating for Wibbandun is slightly inconsistent with the proposed dates of 581–588 for Ceawlin's reign, but those dates are not thought to be precise, merely the most plausible given the available data.

=== Relationships with other kingdoms ===
In addition to the evidence of the Chronicle that Æthelberht was accorded the title of bretwalda, there is evidence of his domination in several of the southern kingdoms of the Heptarchy. In Essex, Æthelberht appears to have been in a position to exercise authority shortly after 604, when his intervention helped in the conversion of King Sæberht of Essex, his nephew, to Christianity. It was Æthelberht, and not Sæberht, who built and endowed St. Pauls in London, where St Paul's Cathedral now stands. Further evidence is provided by Bede, who explicitly describes Æthelberht as Sæberht's overlord.

Bede describes Æthelberht's relationship with Rædwald, king of East Anglia, in a passage that is not completely clear in meaning. It seems to imply that Rædwald retained ducatus, or military command of his people, even while Æthelberht held imperium. This implies that being a bretwalda usually included holding the military command of other kingdoms and also that it was more than that, since Æthelberht is bretwalda despite Rædwald's control of his own troops. Rædwald was converted to Christianity while in Kent but did not abandon his pagan beliefs; this, together with the fact that he retained military independence, implies that Æthelberht's overlordship of East Anglia was much weaker than his influence with the East Saxons. An alternative interpretation, however, is that the passage in Bede should be translated as "Rædwald, king of the East Angles, who while Æthelberht lived, even conceded to him the military leadership of his people"; if this is Bede's intent, then East Anglia firmly was under Æthelberht's overlordship.

There is no evidence that Æthelberht's influence in other kingdoms was enough for him to convert any other kings to Christianity, although this is partly due to the lack of sources—nothing is known of Sussex's history, for example, for almost all of the seventh and eighth centuries. Æthelberht was able to arrange a meeting in 602 in the Severn valley, on the northwestern borders of Wessex, however, and this may be an indication of the extent of his influence in the west. No evidence survives showing Kentish domination of Mercia, but it is known that Mercia was independent of Northumbria, so it is quite plausible that it was under Kentish overlordship.

== Augustine's mission and early Christianisation ==
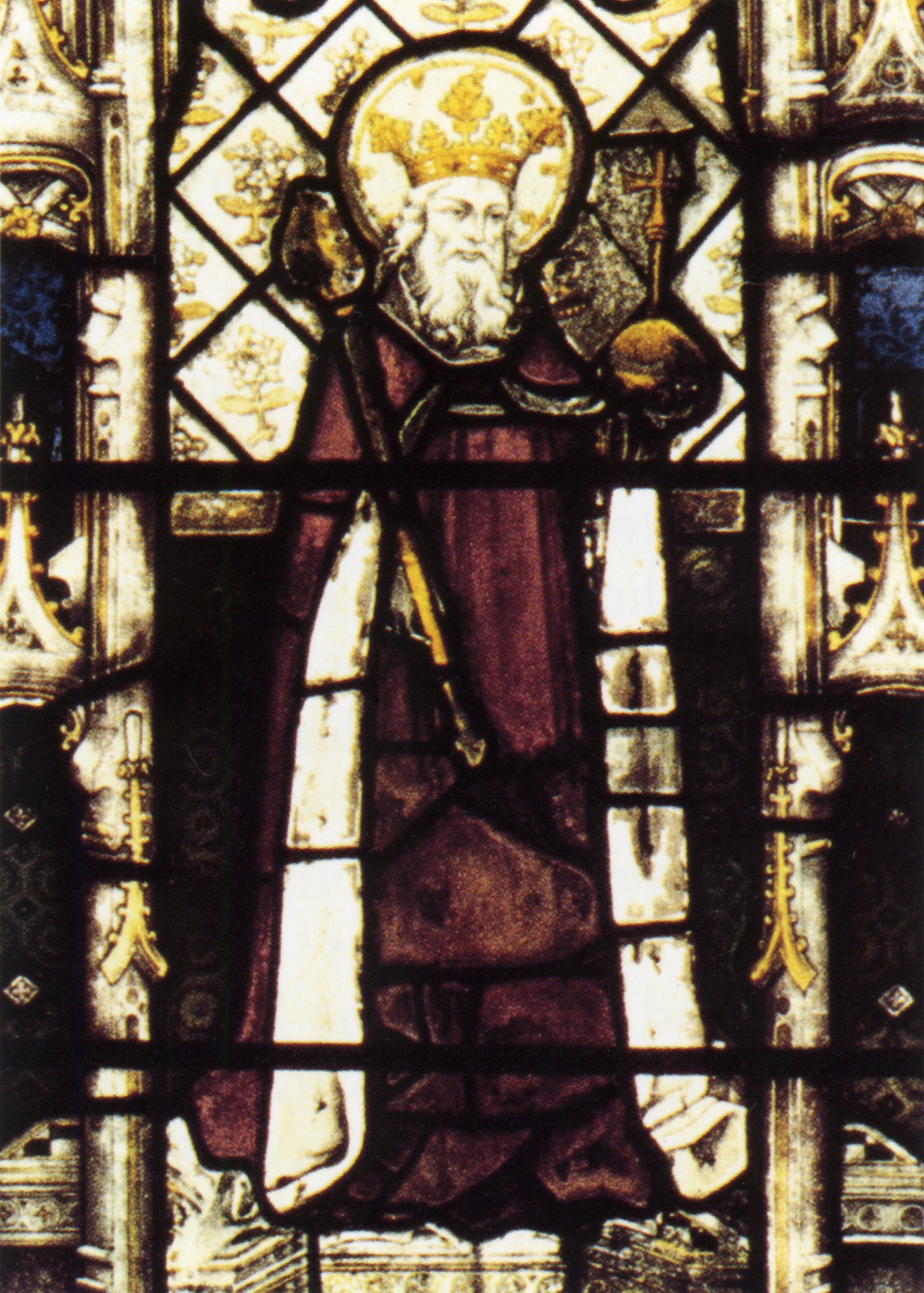
Stained-glass window of Æthelberht from the chapel of All Souls College, Oxford

The native Britons had converted to Christianity under Roman rule. The Anglo-Saxon invasions separated the British church from European Christianity for centuries, so the church in Rome had no presence or authority in Britain, and in fact, Rome knew so little about the British church that it was unaware of any schism in customs. However, Æthelberht would have known something about the Roman church from his Frankish wife, Bertha, who had brought a bishop, Liudhard, with her across the Channel, and for whom Æthelberht built a chapel, St Martin's.

In 596, Pope Gregory the Great sent Augustine, prior of the monastery of St. Andrew in Rome, to England as a missionary, and in 597, a group of nearly forty monks, led by Augustine, landed on the Isle of Thanet in Kent. According to Bede, Æthelberht was sufficiently distrustful of the newcomers to insist on meeting them under the open sky, to prevent them from performing sorcery. The monks impressed Æthelberht, but he was not converted immediately. He agreed to allow the mission to settle in Canterbury and permitted them to preach.

It is not known when Æthelberht became a Christian. It is possible, despite Bede's account, that he already was a Christian before Augustine's mission arrived. It is likely that Liudhard and Bertha pressed Æthelberht to consider becoming a Christian before the arrival of the mission, and it is also likely that a condition of Æthelberht's marriage to Bertha was that Æthelberht would consider conversion. Conversion via the influence of the Frankish court would have been seen as an explicit recognition of Frankish overlordship, however, so it is possible that Æthelberht's delay of his conversion until it could be accomplished via Roman influence might have been an assertion of independence from Frankish control. It also has been argued that Augustine's hesitation—he turned back to Rome, asking to be released from the mission—is an indication that Æthelberht was a pagan at the time Augustine was sent.

At the latest, Æthelberht must have converted before 601, since that year Gregory wrote to him as a Christian king. An old tradition records that Æthelberht converted on 1 June, in the summer of the year that Augustine arrived. Through Æthelberht's influence Sæberht, king of Essex, also was converted, but there were limits to the effectiveness of the mission. Not all of Kentish court converted; Eadbald, Æthelberht's son and heir, was a pagan at his accession. Rædwald, king of East Anglia, was only partly converted (apparently while at Æthelberht's court) and retained a pagan shrine next to the new Christian altar. Augustine also was unsuccessful in gaining the allegiance of the British clergy.

== Law code ==
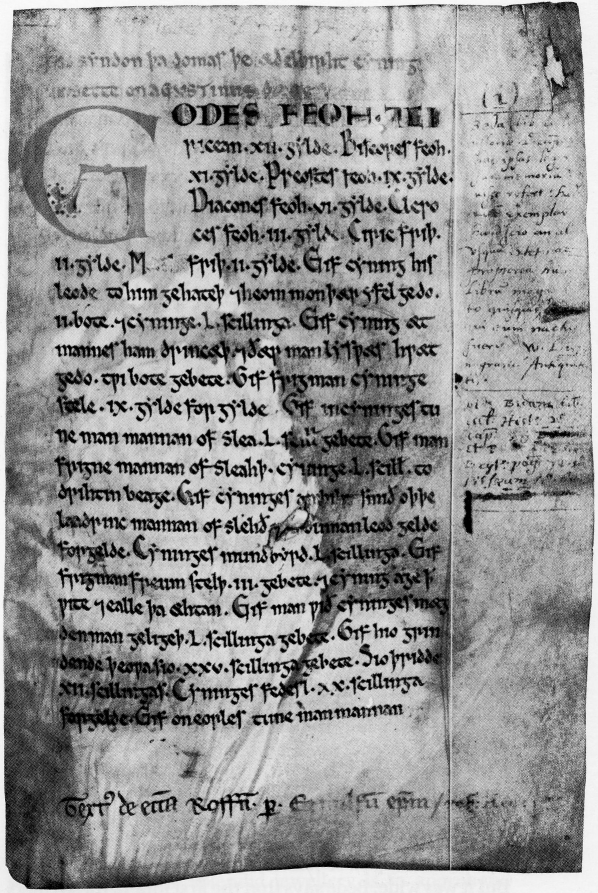
The first page of the twelfth-century manuscript of Æthelberht's law code

Some time after the arrival of Augustine's mission, perhaps in 602 or 603, Æthelberht issued a set of laws, in ninety sections. These laws are by far the earliest-surviving code composed in any of the Germanic countries, and they were almost certainly among the first documents written down in Anglo-Saxon, as literacy would have arrived in England with Augustine's mission. The only surviving early manuscript, the Textus Roffensis, dates from the twelfth century, and it now resides in the Medway Studies Centre in Strood, Kent. Æthelberht's code makes reference to the church in the very first item, which enumerates the compensation required for the property of a bishop, a deacon, a priest, and so on; but overall, the laws seem remarkably uninfluenced by Christian principles. Bede asserted that they were composed "after the Roman manner", but there is little discernible Roman influence either. In subject matter, the laws have been compared to the Lex Salica of the Franks, but it is not thought that Æthelberht based his new code on any specific previous model.

The laws are concerned with setting and enforcing the penalties for transgressions at all levels of society; the severity of the fine depended on the social rank of the victim. The king had a financial interest in enforcement, for part of the fines would come to him in many cases, but the king also was responsible for law and order, and avoiding blood feuds by enforcing the rules on compensation for injury was part of the way the king maintained control. Æthelberht's laws are mentioned by Alfred the Great, who compiled his own laws, making use of the prior codes created by Æthelberht, as well as those of Offa of Mercia and Ine of Wessex.

One of Æthelberht's laws seems to preserve a trace of a very old custom: the third item in the code states that "If the king is drinking at a man's home, and anyone commits any evil deed there, he is to pay twofold compensation." This probably refers to the ancient custom of a king traveling the country, being hosted, and being provided for by his subjects wherever he went. The king's servants retained these rights for centuries after Æthelberht's time.

Items 77–81 in the code have been interpreted as a description of a woman's financial rights after a divorce or legal separation. These clauses define how much of the household goods a woman could keep in different circumstances, depending on whether she keeps custody of the children, for example. It has recently been suggested, however, that it would be more correct to interpret these clauses as referring to women who are widowed, rather than divorced.

== Trade and coinage ==
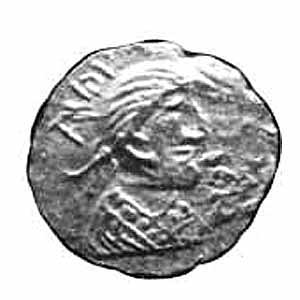
A thrymsa from the reign of Eadbald, Æthelberht's son. None of the coins are known to carry Æthelberht's name, although they may have been minted during his reign.

There is little documentary evidence about the nature of trade in Æthelberht's Kent. It is known that the kings of Kent had established royal control of trade by the late seventh century, but it is not known how early this control began. There is archaeological evidence suggesting that the royal influence predates any of the written sources. It has been suggested that one of Æthelberht's achievements was to take control of trade away from the aristocracy and to make it a royal monopoly. The continental trade provided Kent access to luxury goods which gave it an advantage in trading with the other Anglo-Saxon nations, and the revenue from trade was important in itself.

Kentish manufacture before 600 included glass beakers and jewelry. Kentish jewellers were highly skilled, and before the end of the sixth century they gained access to gold. Goods from Kent are found in cemeteries across the channel and as far away as at the mouth of the Loire. It is not known what Kent traded for all of this wealth, although it seems likely that there was a flourishing slave trade. It may well be that this wealth was the foundation of Æthelberht's strength, although his overlordship and the associated right to demand tribute would have brought wealth in its turn.

It may have been during Æthelberht's reign that the first coins were minted in England since the departure of the Romans: none bear his name, but it is thought likely that the first coins predate the end of the sixth century. These early coins were gold, and probably were the shillings (scillingas in Old English) that are mentioned in Æthelberht's laws. The coins are also known to numismatists as thrymsas.

== Death and succession ==
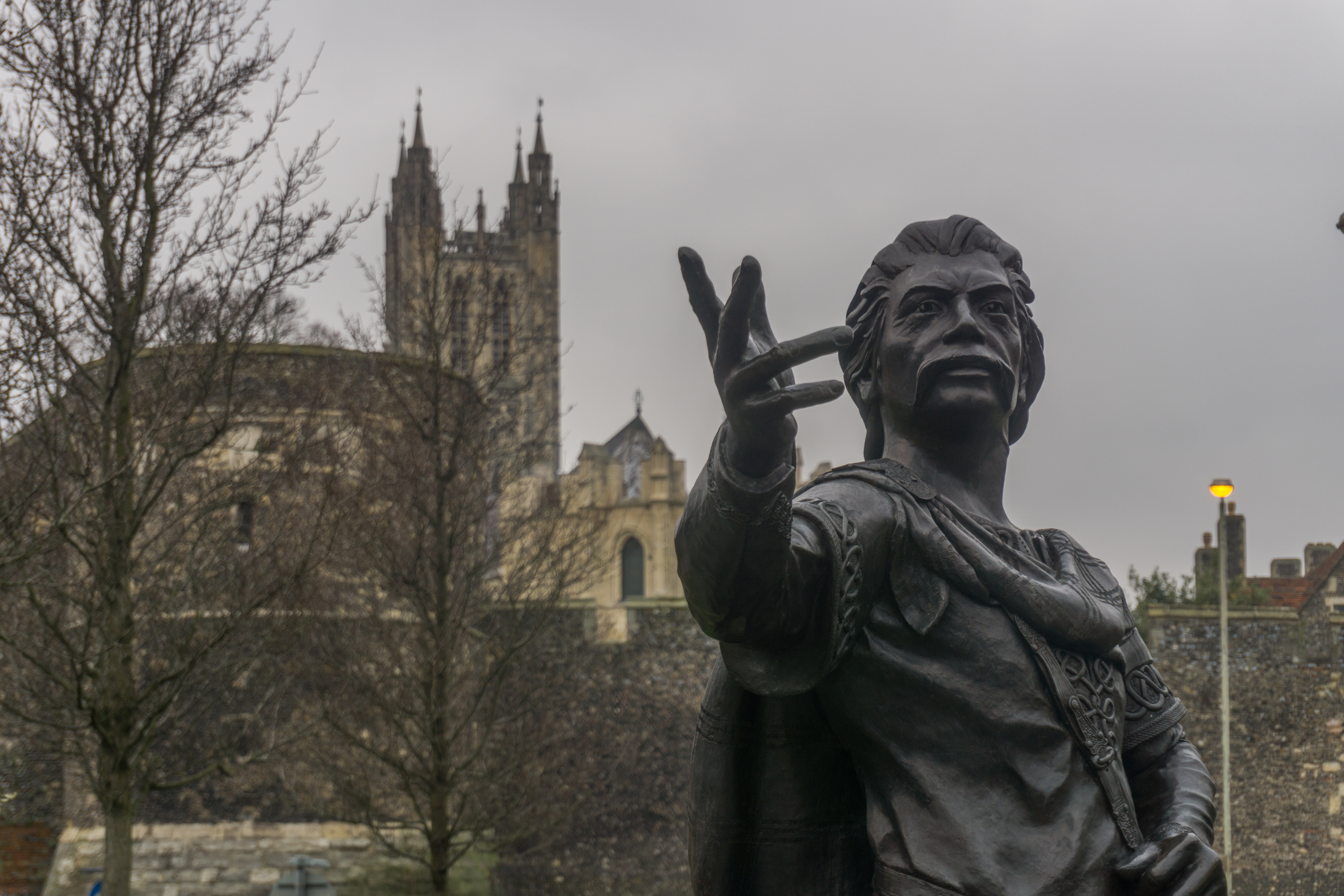
Statue of Æthelberht with Canterbury Cathedral in the background

Æthelberht died on 24 February 616 and was succeeded by his son, Eadbald, who was not a Christian—Bede says he had been converted but went back to his pagan faith, although he ultimately did become a Christian king. Eadbald outraged the church by marrying his stepmother, which was contrary to Church law, and by refusing to accept baptism. Sæberht of the East Saxons also died at approximately this time, and he was succeeded by his three sons, none of whom were Christian. A subsequent revolt against Christianity and the expulsion of the missionaries from Kent may have been a reaction to Kentish overlordship after Æthelberht's death as much as a pagan opposition to Christianity.

In addition to Eadbald, it is possible that Æthelberht had another son, Æthelwald. The evidence for this is a papal letter to Justus, archbishop of Canterbury from 619 to 625, that refers to a king named Aduluald, who is apparently different from Audubald, which refers to Eadbald. There is no agreement among modern scholars on how to interpret this: "Aduluald" might be intended as a representation of "Æthelwald", and hence an indication of another king, perhaps a sub-king of west Kent; or it may be merely a scribal error which should be read as referring to Eadbald.

== Liturgical celebration ==
Æthelberht was later regarded as a saint for his role in establishing Christianity among the Anglo-Saxons. His feast day was originally 24 February but was changed to 25 February. In the 2004 edition of the Roman Martyrology, he is listed under his date of death, 24 February, with the citation: 'King of Kent, converted by St Augustine, bishop, the first leader of the English people to do so'. The Roman Catholic Archdiocese of Southwark, which contains Kent, commemorates him on 25 February.

He is also venerated in the Eastern Orthodox Church as Saint Ethelbert, king of Kent, his day commemorated on 25 February.

== See also ==
- Kentish Royal Legend

== Works cited ==
=== Primary sources ===
- Bede (1991). D.H. Farmer (ed.). Ecclesiastical History of the English People. Translated by Leo Sherley-Price. Revised by R.E. Latham. London: Penguin. ISBN 0-14-044565-X.
- Swanton, Michael (1996). The Anglo-Saxon Chronicle. New York: Routledge. ISBN 0-415-92129-5.
- Law-code of Æthelberht, ed. and tr. F. Liebermann, Die Gesetze der Angelsachsen. 3 vols. Halle, 1898–1916: 3–8 (vol 1); ed. and tr. L. Oliver, The Beginnings of English Law. Toronto Medieval Texts and Translations. Toronto, 2002.
- Letters of Gregory the Great, ed. D. Norberg, S. Gregorii magni registrum epistularum. 2 vols. Turnhout, 1982; tr. J.R.C. Martyn, The letters of Gregory the Great. 3 vols. Toronto, 2004.
- Earliest vita of Gregory the Great, ed. and tr. Bertram Colgrave, The earliest life of Gregory the Great by an anonymous monk of Whitby. Lawrence, 1968.
- Gregory of Tours, Libri Historiarum.

=== Secondary sources ===
- Blackburn, Mark; Grierson, Philip (2006). Medieval European Coinage. Cambridge: Cambridge University Press. ISBN 0-521-03177-X.
- Campbell, James; John, Eric; Wormald, Patrick (1991). The Anglo-Saxons. London: Penguin Books. ISBN 0-14-014395-5.
- Fletcher, Richard (1989). Who's Who in Roman Britain and Anglo-Saxon England. London: Shepheard-Walwyn. ISBN 0-85683-089-5.
- Geary, Patrick J. (1998). Readings in Medieval History. Peterborough: Broadview. ISBN 1-55111-158-6.
- Hunter Blair, Peter (1960). An Introduction to Anglo-Saxon England. Cambridge: Cambridge University Press. pp. 13–16.
- Hunter Blair, Peter (1966). Roman Britain and Early England: 55 B.C. – A.D. 871. New York: W.W. Norton & Company. ISBN 0-393-00361-2.
- Kirby, D.P. (1992). The Earliest English Kings. London: Routledge. ISBN 0-415-09086-5.
- Lapidge, Michael (1999). The Blackwell Encyclopedia of Anglo-Saxon England. Oxford: Blackwell Publishing. ISBN 0-631-22492-0.
- Stenton, Frank M. (1971). Anglo-Saxon England. Oxford: Clarendon Press. ISBN 0-19-821716-1.
- Yorke, Barbara (1990). Kings and Kingdoms of Early Anglo-Saxon England. London: Seaby. ISBN 1-85264-027-8.
