= Magonsæte =

Minor state in Anglo-Saxon England

- c. AD 656 – AD 8th century
- The Magonsæte kingdom
- Capital: Magnis
- Religion: Anglo-Saxon paganism, Anglo-Saxon Christianity
  - c. AD 656-685: Merewalh
  - c. AD 685-700: Mildfrith
  - c. AD 700-8th century: Merchelm
- Historical era: Anglo-Saxon
  - Establishment: c. AD 656
  - Conquest by Mercia: c. AD 8th century
Preceded by	Succeeded by
Pengwern	Mercia
- Today part of: United Kingdom

The Magonsæte kingdom

Magonsæte was a minor sub-kingdom of the greater Anglo-Saxon kingdom of Mercia, thought to be coterminous with the Diocese of Hereford.

The former territory of the Cornovii tribe was conquered by Oswiu of Northumbria in 656, while he was overlord of the Mercians. The west of this region was then occupied by Anglian groups, as well as by Brythonic groups which were already there. One group based itself at the old Roman town of Magnae or (Old Welsh) Cair Magon, modern Kenchester near Hereford.

The sub-kingdom of the Western Hecani existed in the late 7th and early 8th centuries; three of its rulers are known: Merewalh, Mildfrith, and Merchelm. By the later 8th century, the region would seem to have been reincorporated into Mercia, perhaps as Westerna, becoming known as the Magonsæte by the 9th century.

Smaller sub-tribes of the Magonsæte included the Temersæte near Hereford and the Hahlsæte near Ludlow.

The Magonsæte were probably converted to Christianity by British missionaries, as the earliest recorded church organisation resembles that of neighbouring British kingdoms rather than that of the Anglo-Saxons.

== See also ==
- Westerne
- Archenfield
