= 690 =

Calendar year

690 in various calendars
- Gregorian calendar: 690; DCXC
- Ab urbe condita: 1443
- Armenian calendar: 139; ԹՎ ՃԼԹ
- Assyrian calendar: 5440
- Balinese saka calendar: 611–612
- Bengali calendar: 96–97
- Berber calendar: 1640
- Buddhist calendar: 1234
- Burmese calendar: 52
- Byzantine calendar: 6198–6199
- Chinese calendar: 己丑年 (Earth Ox); 3387 or 3180 — to — 庚寅年 (Metal Tiger); 3388 or 3181
- Coptic calendar: 406–407
- Discordian calendar: 1856
- Ethiopian calendar: 682–683
- Hebrew calendar: 4450–4451
- Hindu calendars
- Vikram Samvat: 746–747
- Shaka Samvat: 611–612
- Kali Yuga: 3790–3791
- Holocene calendar: 10690
- Iranian calendar: 68–69
- Islamic calendar: 70–71
- Japanese calendar: Shuchō 5 (朱鳥５年)
- Javanese calendar: 582–583
- Julian calendar: 690; DCXC
- Korean calendar: 3023
- Minguo calendar: 1222 before ROC 民前1222年
- Nanakshahi calendar: −778
- Seleucid era: 1001/1002 AG
- Thai solar calendar: 1232–1233
- Tibetan calendar: ས་མོ་གླང་ལོ་ (female Earth-Ox); 816 or 435 or −337 — to — ལྕགས་ཕོ་སྟག་ལོ་ (male Iron-Tiger); 817 or 436 or −336

Anglo-Saxon kingdoms in Britain (7th century)

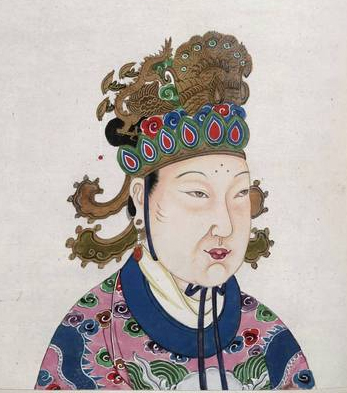
Empress Wu Zetian (c. 625–705)

Year 690 (DCXC) was a common year starting on Saturday of the Julian calendar. The denomination 690 for this year has been used since the early medieval period, when the Anno Domini calendar era became the prevalent method in Europe for naming years.

== Events ==
=== By place ===
==== Britain ====
- King Oswine of Kent is toppled by Wihtred, brother of the late king Eadric of Kent, after a 2-year reign. He takes his lands north of the River Thames, in revenge against the East Saxons (approximate date).

==== Asia ====
- October 16 – Wu Zetian ascends to the throne of the Tang dynasty, and proclaims herself ruler of the Chinese Empire as "Holy and Divine Emperor". She becomes the first and only female "emperor" in 5,000 years of Chinese history. Wu Zetian changes the dynasty's name to the Zhou Dynasty, and begins to murder throne pretendants and ministers who try to oppose her. During her reign she elevates the status of Buddhism above Taoism.

=== By topic ===
==== Entertainment ====
- The approximate date of the earliest known blindfold chess, played by Sa'id ibn Jubayr

==== Religion ====
- Willibrord, Anglo-Saxon missionary, travels from York with 12 Benedictine monks to Westkapelle, (modern Netherlands) to Christianize the pagan Frisians.
- September 19 – Theodore of Tarsus, age 88, dies at Canterbury. He is succeeded by Berhtwald as the 9th Archbishop of Canterbury (approximate date).

== Births ==
- Ashot III, Armenian prince (approximate date)
- Rhodri Molwynog ap Idwal, king of Gwynedd (approximate date)
- Tassilo II, duke of Bavaria (approximate date)
- Yazid II, Muslim caliph (approximate date; d. 724)

== Deaths ==
- September 19 – Theodore of Tarsus, Archbishop of Canterbury (b. 602)
- Aimé, Swiss bishop and saint
- Amalberga of Maubeuge, Lotharingian saint (approximate date)
- Benedict Biscop, Anglo-Saxon abbot
- Bertha of Val d'Or, Frankish abbess (approximate date)
- Julian, archbishop of Toledo (b. 642)
- Kusaila, Berber leader (approximate date)
- Landrada, Frankish abbess (approximate date)
- Nukata, Japanese poet (b. c. 630)
- Oswine, king of Kent (approximate date)
