= Berhtwald =

Archbishop of Canterbury from 692 to 731, Christian saint

Saint Berhtwald
- Archbishop of Canterbury
- Elected: 1 July 692
- Term ended: 13 January 731
- Predecessor: Theodore of Tarsus
- Successor: Tatwine
- Other post: Abbot of Reculver

Orders
- Consecration: 29 June 693 by Godwin

Personal details
- Died: probably 13 January 731
- Buried: Canterbury

Sainthood
- Feast day: 9 January
- Venerated in: Roman Catholic Church, Eastern Orthodox Church
- Canonized: Pre-Congregation

Berhtwald (Note: Also Brihtwald, Beorhtweald, Bertwald, Berthwald, Beorhtwald, or Beretuald) (died 731) was the ninth Archbishop of Canterbury in England. His predecessor had been Theodore of Tarsus. Berhtwald begins the first continuous series of native-born Archbishops of Canterbury, although there had been previous Anglo-Saxon archbishops, they did not succeed each other until Berhtwald's successor Tatwine.

Berhtwald's period as archbishop coincided with the end of Wilfrid's long struggle to regain the Bishopric of York, and the two-year delay between Theodore's death in 690 and Berhtwald's election may have been due to efforts to select Wilfrid for Canterbury. After his election, Berhtwald went to Gaul for consecration and then presided over two councils that attempted to settle the Wilfrid issue, finally succeeding at the second council in 705. Berhtwald was also the recipient of the first surviving letter close in Western Europe.

== Early life ==
Little is known of Berhtwald's ancestry or his early life, but he was born around the middle of the seventh century. By 679, he was made abbot of the monastery at Reculver in Kent, and a charter dated May 679 names Berhtwald as abbot. This charter, from Hlothere, King of Kent, is the earliest surviving original Anglo-Saxon charter.

== Election as archbishop ==
The see of Canterbury was vacant for two years after the death of Theodore before Berhtwald was elected to the office on 1 July 692. The long vacancy resulted from the disturbed conditions in the kingdom of Kent at the time, as various kings fought for control. The succession to the kingdom was disputed between rival claimants Oswine and Wihtred, and various outside kings, including Caedwalla and Swaefheard raided and plundered Kent. Eventually, Wihtred secured the throne, around 691 or early 692, as Bede names Wihtred as King of Kent, along with Swaefheard, at the time of Berhtwald's election. Swaerfheard, however, is not named as king of Kent after this date.

The vacancy may also have occurred because Wilfrid, who was at that point having problems in Northumbria, desired to become Archbishop of Canterbury. A contemporary biographer of Wilfrid, Stephen of Ripon, says that Theodore had wished for Wilfrid to succeed Theodore at Canterbury. Æthelred of Mercia may have supported Wilfrid's translation to Canterbury also, but despite these desires, the translation did not happen. Berhtwald was consecrated on 29 June 693, having travelled to France for his consecration as archbishop of Canterbury by Godwin, Archbishop of Lyon. Berhtwald went to the continent for consecration probably because he feared that his election was not supported by all of the kings and bishops. After his consecration, Berhtwald travelled to Rome to obtain the support of Pope Sergius I, who wrote to a number of Anglo-Saxon kings and bishops in support of the archbishop. Two of these letters survive, and their authenticity has been doubted, mainly because they are only preserved as part of the post-Norman Conquest Canterbury-York dispute. Historians have since come to regard the two letters as genuine. Sergius also gave Berhtwald a pallium, the symbol of an archbishop's authority.

== Archbishop ==
Berhtwald appears to have been involved in the governance of the church, establishing the bishopric of Sherborne in Wessex and it was during his tenure that Sussex, the last pagan kingdom in England, was converted to Christianity. He also consecrated the first Bishop of Selsey. During his time in office, King Wihtred of Kent in the Law of Wihtred exempted the church from taxation. Berhtwald was a proponent of his predecessor's view of the archbishops of Canterbury as primates of the entire island of Britain. Berhtwald co-operated closely with Wihtred in the kingdom, and secured the exemption of the church from taxation under Wihtred's laws issued in 695. The law code also dealt with other ecclesiastical matters, including marriage, Sunday observance, and pagan worship. This law code resulted from a royal council that was held at Bearsted. Further privileges for the church were issued in 699, and may have been composed by Berhtwald before being promulgated. Another privilege, usually referred to as the "Privilege of Wihtred", is claimed to be a grant from Wihtred to the monasteries of Kent of exemption from non-clerical control. However, this is actually a ninth-century forgery.

Much of Berhtwald's time in office coincided with the efforts of Wilfrid to regain the see of York and to reverse the division of York into smaller dioceses. Berhtwald was opposed to Wilfrid's desire to restore some separated bishoprics to the bishopric of York as well as regaining his old see. Wilfrid's problems had begun during the archbishopric of Berhtwald's predecessor, Theodore of Tarsus, when Wilfrid had quarreled with the King of Northumbria, Ecgfrith, and was expelled from the north. Theodore had taken the opportunity to divide the large see of York into a number of smaller dioceses, and Wilfrid had appealed to the papacy in Rome. Berhtwald inherited the dispute and presided at the Council of Austerfield in 702, at which Wilfrid's biographer relates the story that King Aldfrith of Northumbria, Berhtwald, and the other enemies of Wilfrid conspired to deprive Wilfrid of all his offices and possessions. A more likely story is that Berhtwald managed to secure concessions from the Northumbrians and tried to broker a compromise. The offer in the end was that Wilfrid would retire to Ripon and cease acting as a bishop. Wilfrid rejected this compromise and once more appealed to the pope. Three years later, at a further Council, it was arranged that Wilfrid should receive the Bishopric of Hexham in place of that of York. This was the Council of Nidd, usually dated to 706, and it was held in Northumbria. Bede also mentions that Berhtwald consecrated a number of bishops, including Tobias as Bishop of Rochester.

One of Berhtwald's letters has been preserved, sent to Forthhere, Bishop of Sherborne, and asking Forthhere to intercede with Beorwold, the Abbot of Glastonbury, to ransom a slave. Another letter, this one addressed to Berhtwald, from Waldhere, Bishop of London, also survives. The main interest in the second letter is that it is the oldest surviving letter close in Western Europe. This second letter also relates that Waldhere and Berhtwald had attended a synod which can be dated to sometime between 703 and 705, where the kingdom of Wessex was threatened with excommunication. A charter witnessed by Berhtwald which mentions a supposed 706 council, numbered 54 by Sawyer, is now known to be a fake, although the witness list may be based on a legitimate 8th century charter that no longer survives. Likewise, a charter with Berhtwald as a witness and relating to the 716 Council of Clofesho is also known to be a 9th-century forgery, although again it may have been based on actual documents from the council.

== Death and legacy ==
Berhtwald died on 13 January 731. An epitaph to him in verse survives, and may have been placed over his tomb, which was at Canterbury. Subsequently he was canonised with a feast day of 9 January. Little evidence of extensive cult activity exists, however, and the main evidence for his sainthood is a late medieval entry in a St Augustine's calendar. Berhtwald is the first of the continuous series of native-born archbishops in England, although there had been two previous Anglo-Saxon archbishops at Canterbury—Deusdedit and Wighard.

== Citations ==
Christian titles
Preceded by Theodore of Tarsus	Archbishop of Canterbury; 693–731	Succeeded by Tatwine
