= 673 =

Calendar year

673 in various calendars
Gregorian calendar	673; DCLXXIII
Ab urbe condita	1426
Armenian calendar	122; ԹՎ ՃԻԲ
Assyrian calendar	5423
Balinese saka calendar	594–595
Bengali calendar	79–80
Berber calendar	1623
Buddhist calendar	1217
Burmese calendar	35
Byzantine calendar	6181–6182
Chinese calendar	壬申年 (Water Monkey); 3370 or 3163 — to — 癸酉年 (Water Rooster); 3371 or 3164
Coptic calendar	389–390
Discordian calendar	1839
Ethiopian calendar	665–666
Hebrew calendar	4433–4434
- Hindu calendars
Vikram Samvat	729–730
Shaka Samvat	594–595
Kali Yuga	3773–3774
Holocene calendar	10673
Iranian calendar	51–52
Islamic calendar	53–54
Japanese calendar	Hakuchi 24 (白雉２４年)
Javanese calendar	564–565
Julian calendar	673; DCLXXIII
Korean calendar	3006
Minguo calendar	1239 before ROC 民前1239年
Nanakshahi calendar	−795
Seleucid era	984/985 AG
Thai solar calendar	1215–1216
Tibetan calendar	ཆུ་ཕོ་སྤྲེ་ལོ་ (male Water-Monkey); 799 or 418 or −354 — to — ཆུ་མོ་བྱ་ལོ་ (female Water-Bird); 800 or 419 or −353

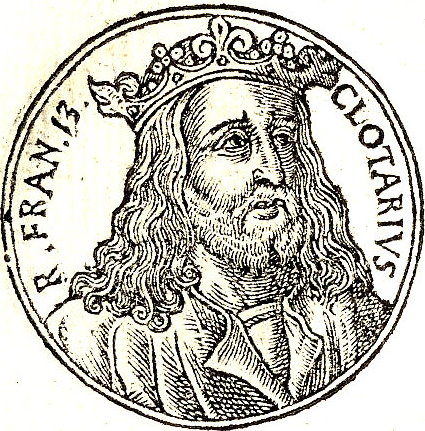
King Chlothar III of Neustria and Burgundy

Year 673 (DCLXXIII) was a common year starting on Saturday of the Julian calendar. The denomination 673 for this year has been used since the early medieval period, when the Anno Domini calendar era became the prevalent method in Europe for naming years.

== Events ==
=== By place ===
==== Europe ====
- Spring – King Chlothar III of Neustria and Burgundy dies after a reign of 16 years, in which he has been a puppet — roi fainéant — of the Neustrian mayor of the palace, Ebroin. He is buried in the Basilica of St. Denis, and succeeded by his brother Theuderic III.
- Burgundian nobles, under the leadership of bishop Leodegar and Adalrich, invite Childeric II to become king in Neustria and Burgundy. He invades Theuderic's kingdom and displaces his brother, becoming sole king of the Frankish Kingdom.
- September 3 – King Wamba of the Visigoths puts down the revolt by Hilderic, governor of Nîmes and rival for the throne. He captures the rebel leaders, who are brought to trial and, for their crimes, scalped and imprisoned for life.

==== Britain ====
- King Frithuwold of Surrey flourishes under Mercian domination. The marriage of his daughter Osgyth to King Sighere of Essex breaks down. She desires the religious life, and flees the Essex court to the protection of bishop Bedwinus of North Elmham (Norfolk).
- King Domangart mac Domnaill of Dál Riata (Scotland) dies, and is succeeded by his nephew Máel Dúin mac Conaill. He probably submits to King Ecgfrith of Northumbria as his overlord.
- July 4 – King Ecgberht I of Kent dies after a reign of nearly 9 years. He is succeeded by his brother Hlothhere.

==== Asia ====
- March 20 – Emperor Tenmu assumes the Chrysanthemum Throne of Japan at the Palace of Kiyomihara, in Asuka.

=== By topic ===
==== Religion ====
- Æthelthryth, Anglo-Saxon princess, returns to East Anglia and founds the Abbey of Ely (Cambridgeshire). At about this time a small nunnery is also founded in her name, in Stow Green.
- The Council of Hertford is held and convened by Theodore of Tarsus, archbishop of Canterbury. The council makes canons for the English Church.

== Births ==
- Æthelburg, queen of Wessex (approximate date)
- Bede, Anglo-Saxon theologian and historian (or 672)
- Pega, Anglo-Saxon anchoress (approximate date)
- Zhang Jiuling, chancellor of the Tang dynasty (d. 740)

== Deaths ==
- July 4 – Ecgberht, king of Kent
- August 18 – Kim Yu-shin, general of Silla (b. 595)
- Agilbert, Anglo-Saxon bishop (approximate date)
- Chlothar III, king of Neustria and Burgundy (b. 652)
- Domangart mac Domnaill, king of Dál Riata (Scotland)
- Remaclus, Frankish missionary (approximate date)
- Yan Liben, painter and official of the Tang dynasty
- Ziyad ibn Abi Sufyan, Muslim general
