= Eadbert I of Kent =

King of Kent from 725 to 748

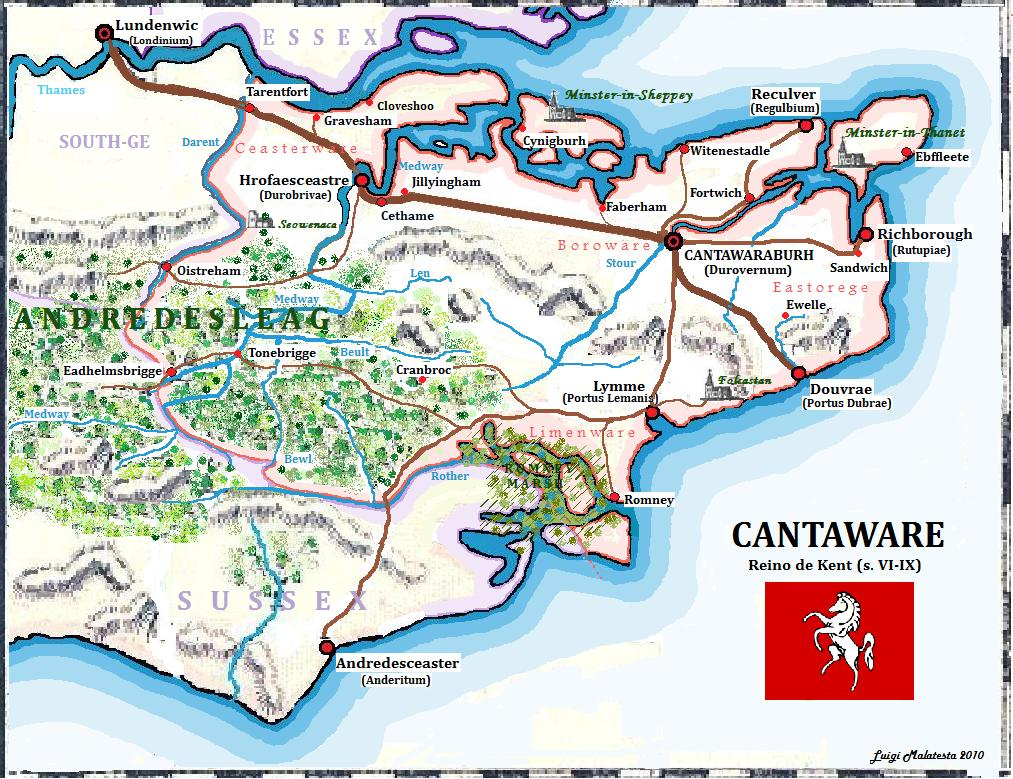
General map of the Kingdom of Kent (Cantaware Rice)

Eadberht I was king of Kent from 725 to 748. After his father Wihtred of Kent died, he inherited the kingdom of Kent along with his two brothers Æðelberht II and Alric. Æðelberht II seems to have been the eldest and dominant brother. Eadberht I died in 748, according to the Anglo-Saxon Chronicle. He left a son, Eardwulf, who succeeded as king jointly with his uncle.

His one complete surviving charter apparently dates from 14 October 727. Another charter is an altered copy of one issued by Æðelberht II. Other charters attributed to Eadberht I are copies of charters of Eadberht II with “deliberate chronological falsification”.

== See also ==
- List of monarchs of Kent

| Preceded by Wihtred | King of Kent; 725–748; With: Aethelbert II 725–762; Eardwulf 747–762 | Succeeded by Eanmund |
