= Ithamar (bishop) =

7th-century Bishop of Rochester and saint

Saint Ithamar
- Bishop of Rochester
- Term ended: between 655 and 664
- Predecessor: Paulinus of York
- Successor: Damianus

Orders
- Consecration: before 655 by Honorius of Canterbury

Personal details
- Died: between 655 and 664 Rochester
- Denomination: Chalcedonian Christianity

Sainthood
- Feast day: 10 June
- Venerated in: Anglican Communion, Eastern Orthodox Church, Roman Catholic Church

Ithamar (sometimes Ythamar) was the first bishop in England to be Saxon-born rather than consecrated by the Irish or from among Augustine's Roman missionaries. He was also the first Saxon bishop of Rochester.

== Life ==
Ithamar was consecrated by the Archbishop of Canterbury, Honorius, and was said by Bede to be "of the Kentish nation, but not inferior to his [episcopal] predecessors for learning and conduct of life".

Upon consecration as bishop, Ithamar took his new name from Ithamar, a son of Aaron, from the Old Testament. Although a number of new Anglo-Saxon bishops had taken new names upon either entering religious life or upon consecration as bishops, these names were usually taken from church history. The practice of taking a new name from the Old Testament was extremely rare in the Roman tradition, but did occur more often in the Celtic Church.

As bishop, Ithamar consecrated Deusdedit as the first Saxon archbishop of Canterbury on 26 March 655.

== Death and legacy ==
Ithamar died between 655 and 664, probably close to 656, at Rochester.

After Ithamar's death he was considered a saint and given a shrine at Rochester Cathedral. His feast day is 10 June. There is no written Life detailing his biography, but a short work giving his miracles was composed in the 12th century. At that time, his remains were translated to a new larger shrine in Rochester Cathedral. The work on his miracles survives in one manuscript, MS Corpus Christi College Cambridge 161.

== Citations ==
Christian titles
Preceded by Paulinus of York	Bishop of Rochester; 644–c. 660	Succeeded by Damianus
