= Battle of Otford =

Battle of Otford may refer to:

- Battle of Otford (776)
- Battle of Otford (1016)
