= Æthelbert II of Kent =

King of Kent

Æthelbert II (Old English: Æðelberht; c. 725–762) was king of Kent. Upon the death of his father Wihtred, the kingdom was ruled by Æthelbert II and his brothers Eadberht I and Alric. Æthelbert seems to have outlived both of his brothers and later reigned jointly with his nephew Eardwulf. He died in 762, according to the Anglo-Saxon Chronicle (recorded under 760 due to chronological dislocation). He seems to have left a son, Eadberht II.

He issued a charter before his accession, dated 11 July 724, that was witnessed by his father. As king he issued further charters, confirmed a charter of his brother Eadberht I, and witnessed a charter of his nephew Eardwulf.

During the latter half of Æthelberht II's rule, Kent was under the overlordship of Mercia, but Æthelberht II maintained his position as king.

== See also ==
- List of monarchs of Kent

== Footnotes ==
Preceded by Wihtred	King of Kent; 725–762 with Eadberht I (725–748); Eardwulf (747–762)	Succeeded by Eardwulf
