= Heaberht of Kent =

8th-century king of Kent

Heaberht was a king of Kent in the 8th century, ruling jointly with Ecgberht II.

Heaberht is known from his coins and from charters of other kings. He witnessed or confirmed two charters of Ecgberht II , one dated 765, as is mentioned in a charter of Offa, King of Mercia , dated 764 (atque Heaberhti regis Cantiae).

== See also ==
- List of monarchs of Kent
