= Battle of Otford (776) =

Coordinates: 51°19′N 0°11′E

Date	776
Location	near Otford, Kent
Result	Unknown

Belligerents
Mercia	Kent

Commanders and leaders
Offa of Mercia	

The Battle of Otford was fought in 776 between the Mercians, led by Offa of Mercia, and the Jutes of Kent. The battle took place at Otford, in the modern English county of Kent.

The Anglo-Saxon Chronicle recorded that the Mercians and the people of Kent fought at Otford, without giving the outcome, although it is considered significant that Kent was re-established as an independent kingdom after the battle. The kings of Kent continued to issue charters after 776, without any reference to Offa, so historians have deduced that Otford was a Kentish victory. The charters S 35 (dated 778), S 36 (dated 779) and S 37 (765 x 785) are in the name of Egbert, while S 38 (dated 784) is in the name of King Ealhmund. The changeover between Ecgberht and Ealhmund cannot be dated more precisely than 779–784.

Kent was struggling to remain independent against the growing power of Mercia. In the 770s, the kings of Kent were resisting their demotion to subkings. According to the chronicler Henry of Huntingdon, the Mercians were victorious at the battle near Sevenoaks. The historian Frank Stenton argued that Egbert of Kent defeated Offa and that Kentish independence was restored for some years. Offa's victory over Wessex at Bensington, Mercian pressure resumed and Kent was absorbed into Mercia.
