= Mul of Kent =

King of Kent from 686 to 687

Mul

King of Kent
- Reign: 686–687
- Predecessor: Eadric of Kent
- Successor: Swæfheard
- Died: 687
- House: Wessex
- Father: Cenberht

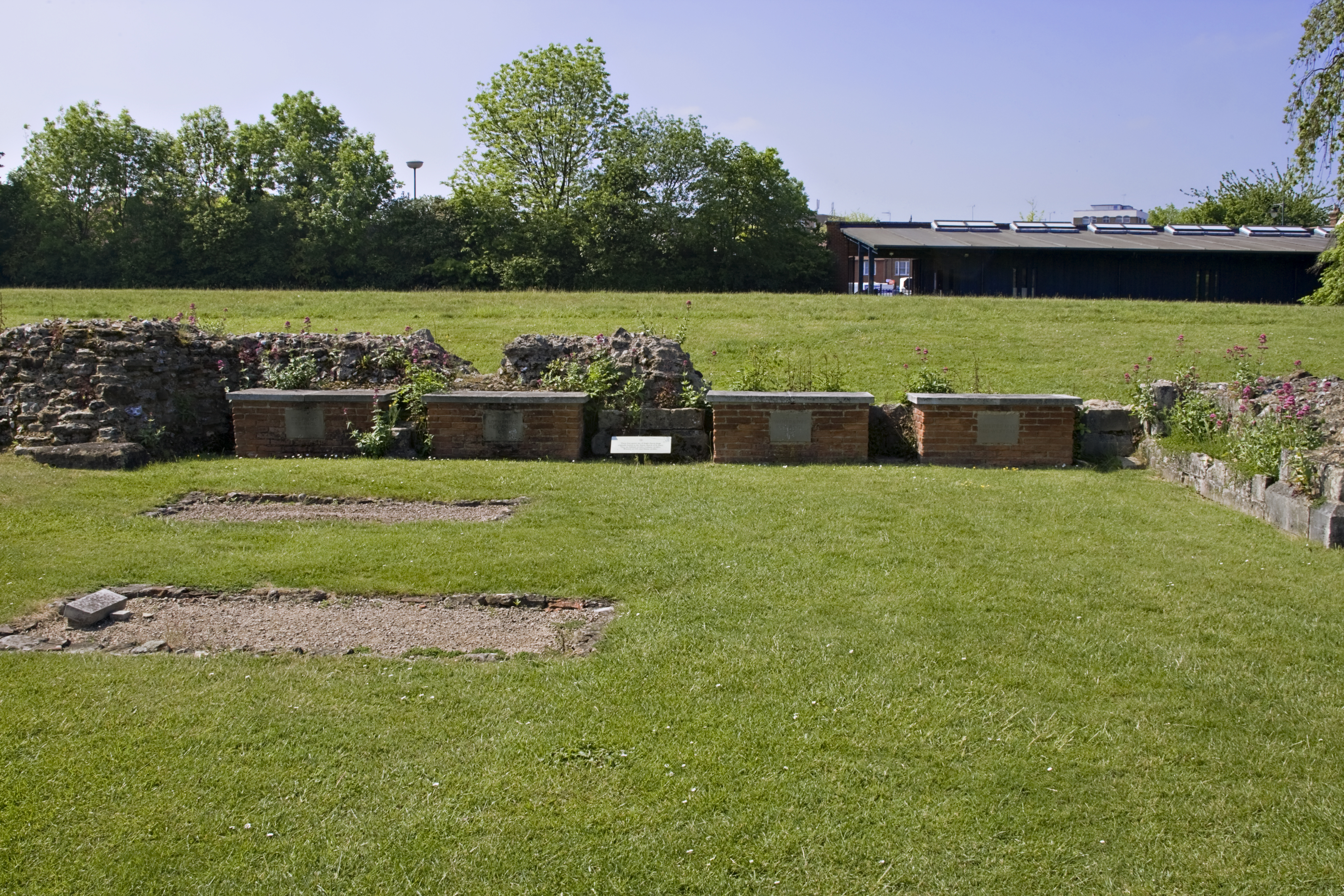
Gravesite at St Augustine's Abbey in Canterbury of four Kentish kings. Mul's is the one on the furthest right.

Mul (Old English: Mūl, literally "mule") (died 687) was an Anglo-Saxon ruler of the Kingdom of Kent in England.

== Biography ==
The name Mul is very unusual and it has been postulated that it derives from the Latin mulus meaning mule, a word which is known to have entered the Old English vocabulary. Presumably it was a nickname which had become habitual. Mul's father was Coenberht, making him a member of the House of Wessex (a descendant of Cynric) and his brother was Caedwalla of Wessex. Mul is described as briefly ruling as King of the Kingdom of Kent following its conquest by Caedwalla in 686. The Anglo-Saxon Chronicle relates that in 686, "Caedwalla and Mul, his brother, ravaged Kent and Wight." Mul's reign is also mentioned in a charter of the later king Swæfheard.

=== Death ===
Mul seems to have only ruled a year before the local population rose up in revolt against him in 687, chasing him and his followers into a building near the church and setting it on fire, burning them to death. The Anglo-Saxon Chronicle reports "Mul was burned in Kent, and 12 other men with him; and that year Caedwalla again ravaged Kent." The same Chronicle notes that in 694, the people of Kent came to terms with Ine of Wessex, Caedwalla's successor, and granted him a sum "because they had burned Mul earlier".

== See also ==
- House of Wessex family tree
- List of monarchs of Kent
- Chronology of Kentish Kings

Regnal titles
Preceded by Eadric	King of Kent; 686–687	Succeeded by Swæfheard, Swæfberht, Oswine
