= Eardwulf of Kent =

King of Kent

Eardwulf

King of Kent
- Predecessor: Æthelbert II
- Successor: Sigered
- Father: Eadberht I

Eardwulf was king of Kent, reigning jointly with Æðelberht II.

Eardwulf is known from two charters, one of which is undated, but identifies Eardwulf's father as Eadberht I (a patre meo Eadberhtuo); the other has a date that is incompatible with its witness list, as it is dated 762, but witnessed by Archbishop Cuðbert, who died in 760; it was also witnessed by King Æðelberht II (Aethilberchtus rex Cantie).

== See also ==
- List of monarchs of Kent
- Chronology of Kentish Kings

Preceded by Æthelbert II	King of Kent; 747–765	Succeeded by Sigered
