= Damian (bishop of Rochester) =

7th-century Bishop of Rochester

Damianus
- Bishop of Rochester
- Appointed: between 655 and 664
- Term ended: c. 664
- Predecessor: Ithamar
- Successor: Putta

Orders
- Consecration: between 655 and 664

Personal details
- Died: c. 664
- Denomination: Christian

Damianus (or Damian) served as Bishop of Rochester from his consecration between 655 and 664 until his death about 664. He was consecrated by Deusdedit, the Archbishop of Canterbury.

== Citations ==
Christian titles
Preceded by Ithamar	Bishop of Rochester c. 656 – c. 664	Succeeded by Putta
