= Wighard =

7th-century Anglo-Saxon Archbishop of Canterbury-elect

- Archbishop-elect of Canterbury
- Appointed: between 664 and 667
- Term ended: between 664 and 667
- Predecessor: Deusdedit
- Successor: Theodore of Tarsus

Orders
- Consecration: probably never consecrated

Personal details
- Died: between 664 and 667 Rome

Wighard (or Wigheard; died between 664 and 667) was a medieval Archbishop-elect of Canterbury. What little is known about him comes from 8th-century writer Bede, but inconsistencies between various works have led to confusion about the exact circumstances of Wighard's election and whether he was ever confirmed in that office. What is clear is that he died in Rome after travelling there for confirmation by the papacy of his elevation to the archbishopric. His death allowed Pope Vitalian to select the next archbishop from amongst the clergy in Rome.

== Life ==
Wighard was a Saxon priest during the late 7th century, and a native of Kent. He served in the household of Archbishop Deusdedit of Canterbury, and was also a priest at Canterbury. The 8th-century writer Bede says that Wighard was selected to be Archbishop of Canterbury, and that he was sent to Rome to visit Pope Vitalian for confirmation and to receive his pallium. How exactly he was selected, and when that occurred, is open to debate, as Bede himself had two different stories. The first one, related in his Historia Abbatum, stated that Wighard was selected by King Ecgberht of Kent. Fifteen years after Bede's completion of the Historia Abbatum, Bede wrote the Historia ecclesiastica gentis Anglorum, which states that Wighard was selected by Oswiu of Northumbria and Ecgberht with the consent of all the clergy and people. Some modern historians have followed Bede's second account, but others feel that only Ecgberht selected Wighard.

The case for excluding Oswiu from any role in Wighard's election is based on the theory that Bede misinterpreted a letter from Vitalian to Oswiu as stating that Oswiu was involved in the selection. The historian Nicholas Brooks points out that although Bede may have indeed misread Vitalian's letter, Oswiu had other reasons for involving himself in Deusdedit's replacement, not least of which was a concern that the exiled Northumbrian bishop Wilfrid, who was in Kent and Mercia at the time, not be selected as the new archbishop. The historian D. P. Kirby sees Oswiu's involvement in Wighard's selection as an attempt to help restore the Anglo-Saxon church, and perhaps as the beginning of steps to secure York as an archbishopric. Brooks points out that one reason Wighard might have journeyed to Rome was to receive his pallium. As it had been the normal practice up until then to have it sent out to England by the papacy, Wighard's travel to Rome would indicate the papacy's approval of his election and ensure the validity of his consecration.

Bede, who is the main source for this information, is unclear on his chronology relating to Wighard. At one point in the Historia Ecclesiastica, he states that Canterbury had been vacant for some time before Wighard's election, but in other writings he implies that Wighard was appointed soon after the conclusion of the Council of Whitby, which likely took place in 664. However Wighard was selected, he died in Rome. His death possibly occurred around 664, but could have been as late as 667. It may have been caused by the bubonic plague, or perhaps was due to some other disease epidemic. Like much else in his life, it is unclear if he was actually consecrated before his death. The Oxford Dictionary of National Biography entry for Wighard states that he died before consecration. The historian Peter Blair, however, states that Wighard died as he was about to head home to Canterbury, after his consecration.

Pope Vitalian wrote to Oswiu after Wighard's death, and this letter is preserved by Bede in his Historia Ecclesiastica. In the letter, which also mentions that a messenger from Oswiu had been among the companions of the archbishop-elect, the pope apologises that he has been unable to find a successor to Wighard yet. Wighard's death in Rome allowed Vitalian the opportunity to choose his successor, and Vitalian chose his friend Theodore of Tarsus to become the next archbishop.

== Citations ==
Christian titles
Preceded by Deusdedit	Archbishop of Canterbury c. 666	Vacant Title next held by Theodore of Tarsus
