= Alric of Kent =

Son of Wihtred, king of Kent

Alric (Old English: Alrīc; 8th century) was a king of the Saxon kingdom of Kent, jointly with Æðelberht II and Eadberht I.

Alric acceded with his two brothers on the death of his father Wihtred, according to Bede, but is otherwise unknown. Kelly observed that the reign of 762 to 796 attributed to him by William of Malmesbury “is evidently fantasy, inspired by a desire to account neatly for all the brothers mentioned by Bede”.

== See also ==
- List of monarchs of Kent
