= Ealhmund of Kent =

Medieval king in England

Ealhmund was King of Kent in 784. He was probably the father of King Ecgberht who was King of Wessex from 802, and who conquered Kent in the 820s. Ecgberht was the grandfather of King Alfred the Great.

== Biography ==
King Offa of Mercia conquered Kent in the 760s, but he had lost control by the late 770s, when King Ecgberht II issued charters in his own name without any reference to Offa. The only contemporary evidence of Ealhmund is a charter he issued as king of Kent, also without any reference to Offa, in 784. The charter granted land at Sheldwich in Kent to the abbot of Reculver. Ealhmund is not known to have struck any coins, and by 785, Offa had regained control of Kent. Ealhmund had probably been killed or driven out.

== Lineage ==
In 802 Ecgberht seized the West Saxon throne, and a genealogy of his son King Æthelwulf, in the Anglo-Saxon Chronicle gives Ecgberht's father as Ealhmund, whose father is given as Eafa, with a descent going back to Cerdic, the traditional founder of the West Saxon dynasty. The information is repeated in a genealogy based on the Anglo-Saxon Chronicle in Asser's life of Alfred the Great, which dates to 893. A late eleventh or early twelfth century Canterbury chronicler identified the father of Ecgberht with the Ealhmund who was king of Kent.

Some scholars accept the claim that Ealhmund was part of a West Saxon lineage, but the historian Heather Edwards argues that a Kentish royal lineage is more likely, and that a West Saxon one was probably invented in order to legitimise Ecgberht's seizure of the West Saxon throne. In the 820s Ecgberht annexed south-east England, and the Chronicle states that "the people of Kent and of Surrey and the South Saxons and the East Saxons submitted to him because they had been wrongfully forced away from his kinsmen". Edwards sees this as a statement that Ecgberht was the descendant of a south-eastern ruling family which had been dispossessed by Offa. Ecgberht had been expelled from England in his youth by Offa and Beorhtric, Ecgberht's predecessor as king of Wessex. The Chronicle states that Beorhtric helped Offa because he was married to his daughter, and Edwards argues that this shows that Ecgberht was a threat to Offa's control of Kent, and that Beorhtric had no personal reason to fear him. She also suggests that Ecgberht may have had a special connection with Kent. For instance, after he briefly dethroned Wiglaf of Mercia in 829, Wessex kept control over the southeast, with Ecgberht holding councils in Kent and involving the Kentish nobility in the affairs of the province. Edwards notes that this style of ruling was very different from the Mercian overlords who issued charters relating to Kentish affairs from councils held in Mercia.

The historian Rory Naismith, however, casts doubt on this interpretation. He argues that the identification of Ecgberht's father as Ealhmund of Kent may rely solely on the compiler of the MS F (bilingual Old English and Latin version) of the Anglo-Saxon Chronicle having had access to Ealhmund's charter of 784, and that perhaps Ecgberht's father and the Kentish king simply shared the same name. The question is whether the compiler knew of Ealhmund only from the coincidence of the charter and genealogy or if he had access to vanished sources that connected Ecgberht to the royal line of Kent, which he considers unlikely but not impossible.

Naismith notes that Ealhmund and Ecgberht's names seem to beckon to previous Kentish rulers, namely Ecgberht I, Ecgberht II and Eadberht III Praen, which corroborates Henry of Huntingdon's claim that Ecgberht of Wessex was related to the latter. Indeed, Barbara Yorke speculates that Ealhmund may have been a West Saxon who strengthened his claim through marriage with the Kentish royal house, perhaps with a kinswoman of Ecgberht II, which would account for the Kentish name of his son Ecgberht. Although, in Naismith's opinion, Henry's testimony is of little independent value and could even be dependent on the conclusions made by the compiler of MS F. Also, "the fluid and widely dissemination of the naming tradition that Ecgberht and his kin drew upon clouds any dynastic affiliation of his name," as Anglo-Saxon aristocratic families had intermarried each other since at least the 7th century onwards.

While he concedes that a forged genealogy could be used to legitimise a dynasty with little concern for biological fact, Naismith argues that the assertion that the people of Kent, Surrey, Sussex and Essex had been forced away from Ecgberht's kinsmen may have an alternative explanation more in line with a West Saxon origin. He mentions the reigns of Cædwalla and Ine, who ruled over substantial parts of Southern England, including most or all of the territory taken by Ecgberht in 825. He then points out that Ecgberht's heirs have successively referred to their kinship with Ine. His grandson, Æthelred I was buried at Wimborne, a monastery founded by Ine's sister Cuthburh, and Ine's laws were part of the material assembled alongside Alfred’s law-code, in the preface to which it was Ine and not Æthelberht I of Kent (whose legislation Alfred asserts he had used), who was called by Alfred "my kinsman".

Naismith maintains that Ecgberht's exile from c. 782 to 802 could be explained by Ecgberht being a scion of both the Kentish and West Saxon royal lines, therefore posing a threat to both Offa and Beorhtric. He states that "had Egbert been a claimant from Kent alone, it is difficult to see why Beorhtric should have played any part in arranging his exile," and that "the same applies to Offa if Egbert’s origins lay solely in Wessex, unless Beorhtric’s position was far more precarious than the Chronicle admits." Nevertheless, Naismith concludes that the true origins of Ecgberht and his family remain something of a mystery, and as far as the most authoritative surviving sources are concerned, he " was born of good West Saxon royal stock," for it is probably what the author(s) of the Anglo-Saxon Chronicle wished to be believed, and the closest we confidently presume of Ecgberht's ancestry.

== See also ==
- List of monarchs of Kent

== Sources ==
- "Charter S 38". The Electronic Sawyer: Online Catalogue of Anglo-Saxon Charters. London, UK: King's College London.
- Edwards, Heather (2004). "Ecgberht [Egbert] (d. 839)". Oxford Dictionary of National Biography. Oxford University Press. doi:10.1093/ref:odnb/8581. (subscription, Wikipedia Library access or UK public library membership required)
- Grierson, Philip; Blackburn, Mark (2006). Medieval European Coinage, With A Catalogue of the Coins in the Fitzwilliam Museum, Cambridge: 1: The Early Middle Ages (5th–10th Centuries). Cambridge: Cambridge University Press. ISBN 0-521-03177-X.
- Kelly, S. E. (2004). "Æthelberht II (d. 762)". Oxford Dictionary of National Biography. Oxford University Press. doi:10.1093/ref:odnb/52310. (subscription, Wikipedia Library access or UK public library membership required)
- Keynes, Simon; Lapidge, Michael, eds. (1983). Alfred the Great: Asser's Life of King Alfred & Other Contemporary Sources. London, UK: Penguin Classics. ISBN 978-0-14-044409-4.
- Naismith, Rory (2001). The Origins of the Line of Egbert, King of the West Saxons, 802–839. The English Historical Review, Vol. 126, No. 518, Oxford University Press.
- Whitelock, Dorothy, ed. (1979). English Historical Documents, Volume 1, c. 500–1042 (2nd ed.). London, UK: Routledge. ISBN 978-0-415-14366-0.
- Yorke, Barbara. "Edward as Ætheling," in Edward the Elder 899-924, edited by N.J. Higham and David Hill, 25–39. London: Routledge, 2001.
