= Ecgberht II of Kent =

King of Kent

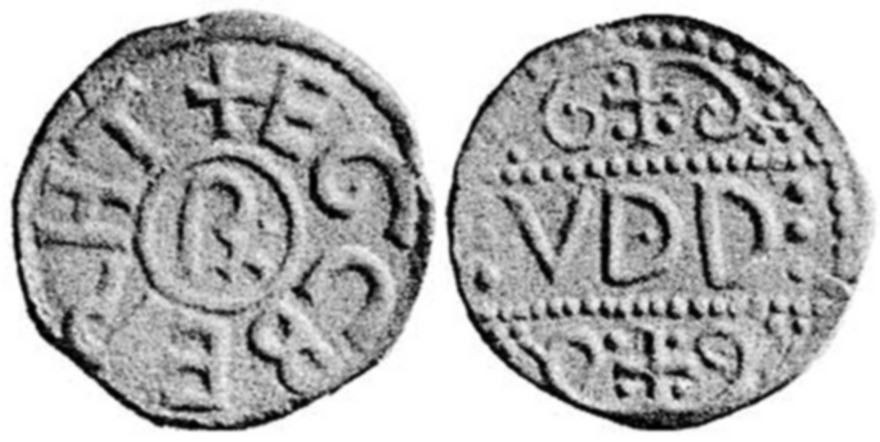
Coin of Ecgberht, Fitzwilliam Museum.

Ecgberht II was king of Kent jointly with Heaberht.

Ecgberht II is known from his coins and charters, ranging from 765 to 779, two of which were witnessed or confirmed by Heaberht.

Ecgberht II acceded by 765, when he issued his earliest surviving charter. However, around this time Offa, king of Mercia, appears to have been attempting to rule Kent directly, as he seems to have issued or confirmed a number of charters relating to Kent. According to the Anglo-Saxon Chronicle, a battle was fought at Otford in 776, and, although the outcome was not recorded, the fact that Kent seems to have remained independent for several years afterward suggests that Ecgberht was victorious. It is known that he remained king until at least 779, the date of his latest charter.

== See also ==
- List of monarchs of Kent

Preceded by Heaberht	King of Kent; 765–779	Succeeded by Ealhmund
