= List of monarchs of Kent =

Monarchs of the Kingdom of Kent

This is a list of the kings of the Anglo-Saxon Kingdom of Kent.

The regnal dates for the earlier kings are known only from Bede. Some kings are known mainly from charters, of which several are forgeries, while others have been subjected to tampering in order to reconcile them with the erroneous king lists of chroniclers, baffled by blanks, and confused by concurrent reigns and kings with similar or identical names. It is commonplace for the later kings to be referred to as subkings, but the actual rank used is always rex, never regulus (except for a late legend concerning Eormenred). The usual style was simply King of Kent (rex Cantiae) or King of the Kentish Men (rex Cantuariorum). Territorial division within Kent is not alluded to, except by Eadberht I (rex Cantuariorum terram dimidii) and Sigered (rex dimidie partis prouincie Cantuariorum).

== List of kings of Kent ==
Reign	Incumbent	Style	Notes
455–488	Hengest	no charters	father of Oisc or Octa
455	Horsa	no charters	brother of Hengest
488–512/516	Oisc (Œsc, Æsc, Ash, Oeric)	no charters	son of Hengest or Octa
512/516–534/540	Octa (Octha)	no charters	son of Hengest
534/540–c. 590	Eormenric	no charters	father of Æðelberht I
c. 590 – 24 February 616 (Bede)	Æðelberht I	no genuine charters	first Christian King of Kent; married to Bertha, a Merovingian princess; father of Æthelburg, Queen Consort of Northumbria
February 616 – 20 January 640 (Bede)	Eadbald	no genuine charters	son of Æðelberht I; married to Emma of Austrasia, likely another Merovingian princess
unknown	Æðelwald	no charters	contemporary with Pope Boniface V (619–625)
January 640 – 14 July 664 (Bede)	Eorcenberht	no charters	son of Eadbald
unknown	Eormenred	Irminredus	brother of Eorcenberht
July 664 – 4 July 673 (Bede)	Ecgberht I	no charters	son of Eorcenberht
acceded 674 or 675, d. 685	Hlothhere	Lotharius rex Cantuariorum; Lotharius rex Cancie; Clotharius; Hlotharius	son of Eorcenberht; reigning jointly with Eadric
685–686 (Bede)	Eadric	Eadricus rex Cantuariorum; Ædricus rex Edricus	son of Ecgberht I; reigning jointly with Hlothhere
killed 687	Mul	Mulo rege regnum Cantie	brother of Cædwalla, King of Wessex
acceded 687 or 688, still reigning 692	Swæfheard	Suebhardus rex Cantuariorum; Sueaberdus rex Cantie	son of Sæbbi, King of Essex, reigning jointly in Kent with Oswine and Withred
fl. 689	Swæfberht	Gabertus; Suebertus rex Cantuariorum	jointly with Oswine
fl. 689–690	Oswine	Oswynus rex Cantie; Oswinus rex Cantuariorum	jointly with Swæfberht and Swæfheard
acceded c. 693, seven years after Edric's disposition (Malmesbury 1.15), died 23 April 725	Wihtred	Wihtredus rex Cantie; Wythredus rex Cantuariorum; Wihtredus rex Cantuariorum	son of Ecgberht I; reigned jointly with Swæfheard
succeeded 725	Alric	no charters	son of Wihtred; succeeded jointly with his brothers Æðelberht II and Eadberht I
725–748	Eadberht I	Eadbertus rex Cantuariorum terram dimidii Ædbeortus rex Cantie	son of Wihtred; reigned jointly with his brothers Æðelberht II and Ælfric
Subject to Mercian overlordship
725–762	Æðelberht II	Æthilberhctus rex Cantie Athelbertus rex	son of Wihtred; reigned jointly with his brothers Eadberht I and Ælfric, and nephew Eardwulf
unknown	Eardwulf	Earduulfus rex Cantuariorum; Eardulfus rex Cantiae	son of Eadberht I; reigned jointly with Æðelberht II; contemporary with Archbishop Cuðbert (740–760)
fl. 762	Eadberht II	Eadberht rex Cantiae; Ædbertus rex Eadbertus rex Cantie	jointly with Sigered
fl. 762	Sigered	Sigiraed rex Cantiae; Sigeredus rex dimidie partis prouincie Cantuariorum	jointly with Eadberht II
762–764	Eanmund	Eanmundus rex	contemporary with Archbishop Bregowine (761–764)
fl. 764–765	Heaberht	Heaberhtus rex Cantie; Heaberhtus rex	jointly with Ecgberht II
fl. 765–779	Ecgberht II	Ecgberhtus rex Cantie; Egcberhtus rex Cantiae; Egcberht rex Cantie; Egcberth rex Cantie; Egcberhtus rex	jointly with Heaberht
fl. 784	Ealhmund	Ealmundus rex Canciæ	father of Ecgberht III
Under the direct rule of Offa of Mercia (785–796).
796–798, deposed	Eadberht III Præn	no charters; coins: EADBEARHT REX	Deposed and mutilated by Cœnwulf
acceded 797 or 798, d. 807	Cuðred	Cuthredus Rex Cantiae; Cuðred rex Cantiae; Cuðredus rex cantwariorum	brother of Cœnwulf and Ceolwulf
fl. 809	Cœnwulf	Ceonulfus Christi gracia rex Merciorum atque provincie Cancie	brother of Cuðred and Ceolwulf; also King of Mercia (796–821)
fl. 822–823	Ceolwulf	Ceolwulf rex Merciorum vel etiam Contwariorum; Ceolwulf rex Merciorum seu etiam Cantwariorum	brother of Cuðred and Cœnwulf; also King of Mercia (821–823)
deposed in 825	Baldred	no charters; coins: BALDRED REX CANT	expelled by Æðelwulf in 825
825–839	Ecgberht III	Ecgberht rex occidentalium Saxonum necnon et Cantuariorum	son of Ealhmund; reigned in Kent jointly with his son Æðelwulf; also King of Wessex (802–839)
825–858	Æðelwulf	Aetheluulf rex Æðeluulf rex Cantrariorum; Æthelwolf gratia Dei rex Kanciae; Ætheluulf rex Cancie; Aeðeluulf Rex Cancie; Aetheluulf gratia Dei rex occidentalium Saxonum seu etiam Cantuuariorum; Aeðeluulf gratia Dei rex occidentalium Saxonum nec non 7 Cantuariorum; Eðelwulf rex occidentalium Saxonum nec non et Cantuariorum; Eðeluulfus rex Occidentalium Saxonum necnon et Cantuariorum; Æðelulf rex misericordia Dei occidentalium Saxonum; necnon & Cantuuariorum	jointly with his father Ecgberht III and son Æðelstan; also King of Wessex (839–856)
fl. 839–851	Æðelstan I	Edelstan rex Kancie; Ethelstan Rex; Aeðelstan rex Aedelstan rex	jointly with his father Æðelwulf
fl. 855–866	Æðelberht III	Aeðelberht rex Eþelbearht rex Eðelbearht rex Æthelbertus occidentalium Saxonum necnon et Cantuariorum rex Aeðelbearht rex Occidentalium Saxonum seu Cantuuariorum; Aeðælberht rex Occidentalium Saxonum seu Cantuariorum; Eðelbearht rex occidentalium Saxonum nec non et Cantuariorum	jointly with his father Æðelwulf; also King of Wessex (860–866)
866–871	Æðelred I	Eðelred rex occidentalium Saxonum . non et Cantwariorum; Aeðered rex Occidentalium Saxonum necnon et Cantuariorum	son of Æðelwulf; also King of Wessex (866–871)

== See also ==
- List of English monarchs
- Kentish Royal Legend
- Anglo-Saxon royal genealogies
- On the Resting-Places of the Saints (list of Anglo-Saxon saints - Secgan)

== Sources ==
- Campbell, A. 1973. Charters of Rochester. Anglo-Saxon Charters 1.
- Fryde, E. B., Greenway, D. E., Porter, S., & Roy, I. 1986. Handbook of British Chronology, 3rd ed. Royal Historical Society Guides and Handbooks 2.
- Garmonsway, G. N. 1954. The Anglo-Saxon Chronicle, 2nd edition.
- Kelly, S. E. 1995. Charters of St. Augustine's Abbey Canterbury and Minster-in-Thanet. Anglo-Saxon Charters 4.
- King, J. E. 1930. Baedae Opera Historica. Loeb Classical Library 246 & 248.
- Kirby, D. P. 1991. The Earliest English Kings.
- Sawyer, P. H. 1968. Anglo-Saxon Charters: An Annotated List and Bibliography. Royal Historical Society Guides and Handbooks 8.
- Searle, W. G. 1899. Anglo-Saxon Bishops, Kings and Nobles.
- Sweet, H. 1896. The Student’s Dictionary of Anglo-Saxon.
- Yorke, B. 1990. Kings and Kingdoms of Early Anglo-Saxon England.
