= Eanmund of Kent =

King of the Anglo-Saxon Kingdom of Kent

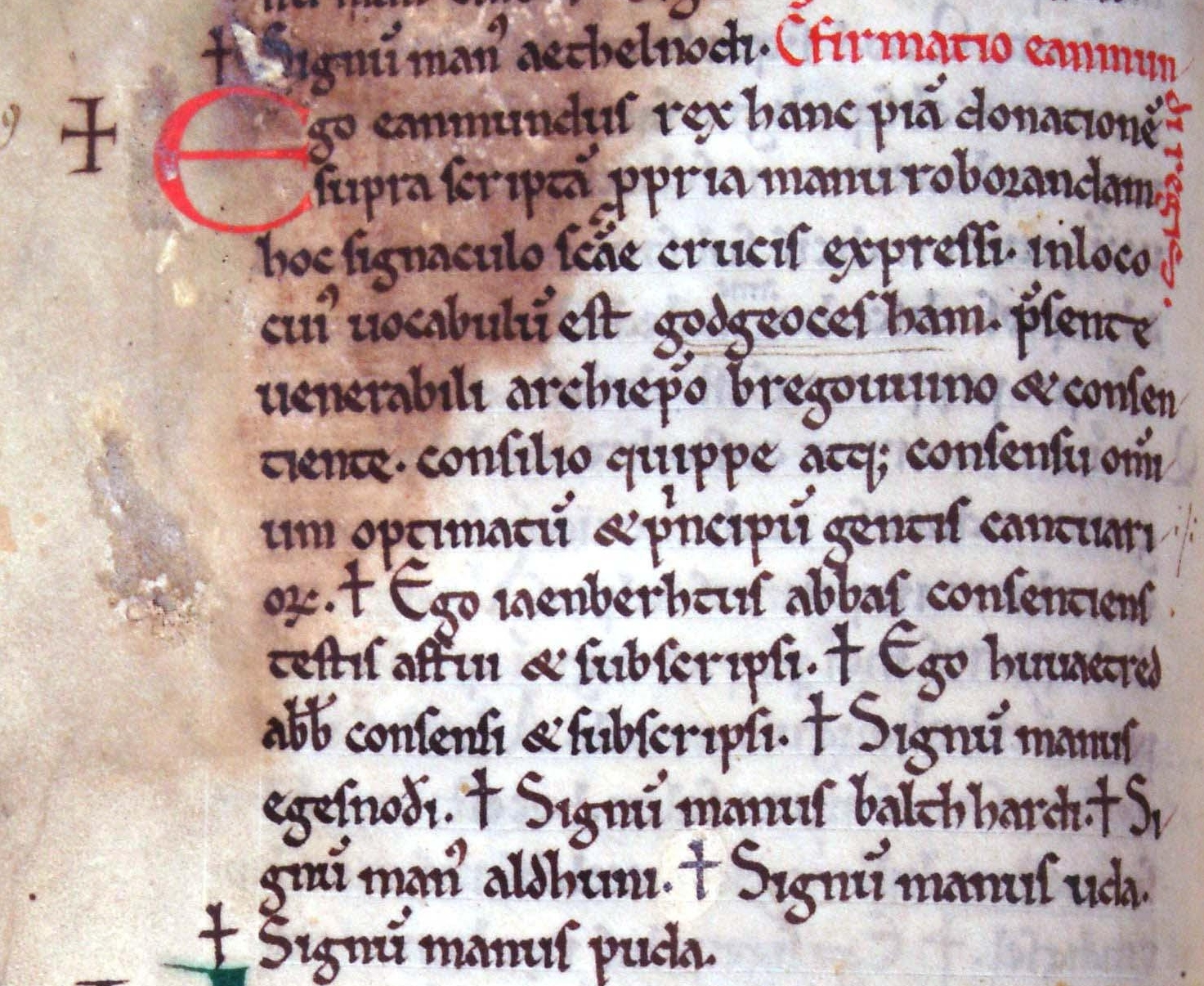
A twelfth-century copy of Eanmund's only known charter.

Eanmund (c. 764–?) was a king of Kent, jointly with or in succession to Sigered of Kent.

Eanmund is known only from an undated confirmation, witnessed by Archbishop Bregowine (761–764), added to a charter of Sigered .

== See also ==
- List of monarchs of Kent
