= Deusdedit of Canterbury =

Archbishop of Canterbury from 655 to 664

Saint Deusdedit
- Archbishop of Canterbury
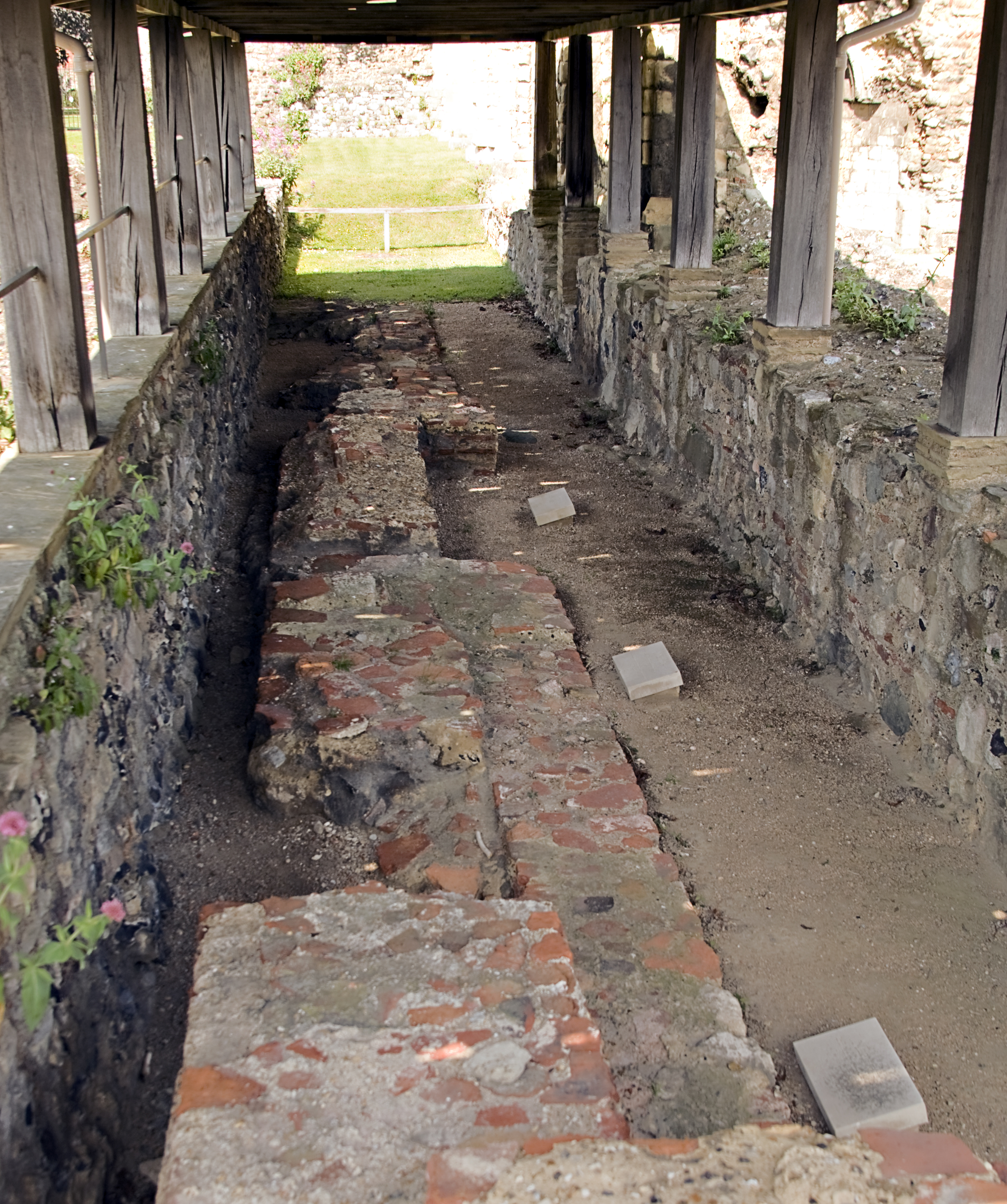
- The location of Deusdedit's unmarked grave, at St Augustine's Abbey in Canterbury. The graves marked with stones are those of Justus, Mellitus, and Laurence.
- Appointed: 655
- Term ended: c. 664
- Predecessor: Honorius
- Successor: Wighard

Orders
- Consecration: March 655 by Ithamar

Personal details
- Born: perhaps Frithona unknown England
- Died: c. 664
- Buried: St Augustine's Abbey, Canterbury

Sainthood
- Feast day: 14 July
- Venerated in: Eastern Orthodox Church; Roman Catholic Church; Anglican Communion
- Canonized: Pre-congregation

Deusdedit (died c. 664) was a medieval Archbishop of Canterbury, the first native-born holder of the see of Canterbury. By birth an Anglo-Saxon, he became archbishop in 655 and held the office for more than nine years until his death, probably from plague. Deusdedit's successor as archbishop was one of his priests at Canterbury. There is some controversy over the exact date of Deusdedit's death, owing to discrepancies in the medieval written work recording his life. Little is known about his episcopate, but he was considered a saint after his death. A saint's life was written after his relics were moved from their original burial place in 1091.

== Life ==
A post-Norman Conquest tradition, originating with Goscelin, gives Deusdedit's original name as Frithona, possibly a corruption of Frithuwine. (Note: The modern historian Peter Hunter Blair gives the name as Frithonas.) He was consecrated by Ithamar, Bishop of Rochester, on 26 March or perhaps 12 March 655. He was the sixth archbishop after the arrival of the Gregorian missionaries, and the first to be a native of the island of Great Britain rather than an Italian, having been born a West Saxon. One reason for the long period between the Christianization of the Kentish kingdom from Anglo-Saxon paganism in about 600 and the appointment of the first native archbishop may have been the need for the schools established by the Gregorian missionaries to educate the natives to a sufficiently high standard for them to take ecclesiastical office. Deusdedit probably owed his appointment to the see of Canterbury to a collaboration between Eorcenberht of Kent and Cenwalh of Wessex. The name Deusdedit means "God has given" in Latin, and had been the name of a recent pope, Deusdedit, in office from 615 to 618; it was the practice of many of the early medieval Saxon bishops to take an adopted name, often from recent papal names. It is unclear when Deusdedit adopted his new name, although the historian Richard Sharpe considers it likely to have been when he was consecrated as an archbishop, rather than when he entered religious life.

The see of Canterbury seems at this time to have been passing through a period of comparative obscurity. During Deusdedit's nine years as archbishop, all the new bishops in England were consecrated by Celtic or foreign bishops, with one exception: Deusdedit consecrated Damianus, Ithamar's successor as Bishop of Rochester. Deusdedit did, however, found a nunnery in the Isle of Thanet and helped with the foundation of Medeshamstede Abbey, later Peterborough Abbey, in 657. He was long overshadowed by Agilbert, bishop to the West Saxons, and his authority as archbishop probably did not extend past his own diocese and that of Rochester, which had traditionally been dependent on Canterbury.

The Synod of Whitby, which debated whether the Northumbrian church should follow the Roman or the Celtic method of dating Easter, was held in 664. Deusdedit does not appear to have been present, perhaps because of an outbreak of plague in England at the time.

== Death ==
Deusdedit died at some time around the Synod of Whitby, although the exact date is disputed. Bede, in the Historia ecclesiastica gentis Anglorum, states that "On the fourteenth of July in the above mentioned year, when an eclipse was quickly followed by plague and during which Bishop Colman was refuted by the unanimous decision of the Catholics and returned to his own country, Deusdedit the sixth Archbishop of Canterbury died." A solar eclipse occurred on 1 May 664, which would appear to make the date of Deusdedit's death 14 July 664. But that conflicts with Bede's own information earlier in the Historia, where he claims that Deusdedit's predecessor, Honorius, "died on the thirtieth of September 653, and after a vacancy of eighteen months Deusdedit, a West Saxon, was elected to the archiepiscopal see and so became the sixth Archbishop. He was consecrated by Ithamar, Bishop of Rochester, on the twenty-sixth of March [655], and ruled the see until his death nine years, four months, and two days later." If this information is accurate, then Deusdedit must have died on 28 July 664. Various methods of reconciling these discrepancies have been proposed. Frank Stenton argues that Bede began his years on 1 September; thus the date of Honorius' death should be considered 30 September 652 in modern reckoning. Further, Stenton argued that medieval copyists had introduced an error into the manuscripts of the Historia, and that Bede meant that the length of Deusdedit's reign was 9 years and 7 months, rather than 9 years and 4 months as stated in the manuscripts. From this, he concludes that Deusdedit's death occurred in the year September 663 to September 664. This would make the year of death correct according to the eclipse, but still leave a discrepancy on the specific day of death, for which Stenton asserted the length calculations given by Bede were more correct than the actual death date given. Thus, Stenton concluded that Deusdedit died on 28 October 663.

Other historians, including Richard Abels, P. Grosjean, and Alan Thacker, state that Deusdedit died on 14 July 664. The main argument was put forward by Grosjean, who claimed that Bede had the consecration date wrong, as 26 March was Maundy Thursday in 655, not a date that would normally have been chosen for a consecration. Grosjean argues that the best method for resolving the conflicts is to just take 14 July 664 as the date of death, and figure backward with the length of reign given by Bede, which gives a consecration date of 12 March 655. Thacker and Abels agree generally, although Thacker does not give a specific consecration date beyond March. Abels adds to Grosjean's arguments Bede's association of Deusdedit's death with that of King Eorcenberht, which Bede gives as occurring on the same day. Bede states that the plague of 664 began soon after the eclipse on 1 May. Nothing in Bede contradicts the date of 14 July 664 for Eorcenberht; therefore, Abels considers that date to be the best fit for the available data. The historian D. P. Kirby agrees that Deusdedit died in 664, although he does not give a precise date within that year.

Most historians state that Deusdedit died of the plague that was prevalent in England at the time. Because Bede records the death of Deusdedit shortly after he mentions the outbreak of the plague, the historian J. R. Maddicott asserts that both Deusdedit and Eorcenberht were struck suddenly with the disease and died quickly. Bede is not specific on the type of plague, but Maddicott argues that because of the time of its eruption and the way it arrived in England, it was probably bubonic plague. Although Bede does not describe either Eorcenberht or Deusdedit's symptoms, he does discuss another victim of the 664 disease, who suffered from a tumour on his thigh, resembling the characteristic groin swellings of bubonic plague.

== Legacy ==
Except for the bare facts of his life, little is known about Deusdedit. Deusdedit's successor as Archbishop of Canterbury, Wighard, had been one of his clergy. Deusdedit was regarded as a saint after his death, with a feast day of 14 July, although the Bosworth Psalter, a late 10th or early 11th-century psalter produced at St Augustine's Abbey, gives a date of 15 July. His feast day is designated as a major feast day, and is included along with those of a number of other early Canterbury archbishops in the Bosworth Psalter. Deusdedit was buried in the church of St Augustine's in Canterbury, but was translated to the new abbey church in 1091. A hagiography, or saint's biography, on Deusdedit was written by Goscelin after the translation of his relics, but the work was based mainly on Bede's account; the manuscript of the De Sancto Deusdedit Archiepiscopo survives as part of British Library manuscript (ms) Cotton Vespasian B.xx. Because of the late date of the Sancto, Bede's Historia is the main source for what little is known about Deusdedit. Other than the hagiography, there is scant evidence of a cult surrounding him. His shrine survived until the dissolution of the monasteries in the 1530s.

== Citations ==
Christian titles
Preceded by Honorius	Archbishop of Canterbury; 655–c. 664	Succeeded by Wighard
