= Æthelred and Æthelberht =

Princes of the Kingdom of Kent

Saints Aethelred and Aethelberht of Kent (of Eastry)
- Born: seventh century
- Died: c. 669
- Venerated in: Anglo-Saxon Christianity
- Major shrine: Ramsey Abbey in Huntingdonshire; Canterbury
- Feast: 17 October (translation of relics)
- Attributes: with Aethelberht, as royal brothers, sometimes with swords

Saints Æthelred and Æthelberht (also Ethelred, Ethelbert) according to the Kentish royal legend (attested in the 11th century) were princes of the Kingdom of Kent who were murdered in around AD 669, and later commemorated as saints and martyrs. Their story forms an important element in the legend of Saint Mildrith, because the monastery of Minster in Thanet is said to have been founded in atonement for the crime.

== Historical context ==
King Eorcenberht of Kent seized the rule of Kent in 640 in precedence to his elder brother Eormenred. Both were sons of Eadbald of Kent (r. c. 616–640). The legend, contained in a Latin Passio, tells that Eormenred and his wife Oslafa had several children including the two sons Aethelred and Aethelberht, and a daughter Eormenbeorg, also known as Domne Eafe. Eafe married Merewalh, ruler of the Maegonsaetan, a people situated in the west Midlands in the Shropshire area. King Eorcenberht married Seaxburh, daughter of King Anna of East Anglia, and ruled as a Christian king: he was the first ruler to order the abandonment and destruction of idols throughout his kingdom, and to establish the forty days' fast of Lent to be observed by royal authority (Bede, Ecclesiastical History of the English People, iii,8). He had two sons, Ecgberht and Hlothhere, and two daughters, Eormenhild and Eorcongota. On Eorconberht's death of the plague in 664, Ecgberht succeeded him as King of Kent.

== The legend ==
According to the legend, the princes were very pious Christian youths and lived at Eastry, Kent, at a royal dwelling belonging to their cousin King Egberht. (It is likely that such a residence existed, for Sir Frank Stenton pointed out that the placename Eastry, comparable to Surrey in formation, represented an early administrative centre.) A royal retainer named Thunor wished to secure the succession of King Ecgberht from a possible rival claim by these youths. He therefore had them secretly murdered, and their bodies hidden beneath the royal seat in the Hall at Eastry. After they were missed, but nowhere found, the crime was revealed by a column of light which appeared shining above the place of concealment.

When King Egberht learned of the crime he was filled with sorrow and remorse at the act which had been done in his name, and planned to have the bodies buried at Canterbury. However, the people charged with the task of taking the bodies there found it impossible to move them. After these efforts the king took advice from his religious leaders, who recommended that he have them taken to Wakering in the Kingdom of Essex for burial, where a monastery already existed. The site was probably Great Wakering, not many miles away from the possibly royal burial-site of Prittlewell, Essex. With this new destination it is said the bodies consented to be moved, and were venerated in their final resting-place as royal Christian martyrs.

At about this time Egberht's mother Queen Seaxburh founded her own double monastery at Minster in Sheppey, on the south bank of the Thames Estuary nearly opposite Wakering. The monastery at Reculver was founded in 669. Ecgberht then founded the monastery of Minster in Thanet, to be ruled over by the sister of the murdered princes. She was the mother of Saint Mildrith, who afterwards succeeded her as abbess. Some sources also claim that another monastery was established at Eastry for the same reason, over which a sister of Mildrith's ruled as abbess. Another sister, Mildburg, remained among the Magonsaetan and governed the monastery of Much Wenlock in Shropshire.

In addition to the Latin Passio (edited by David Rollason) a version of the story appears in Roger of Wendover's Flores Historiarum (Flowers of History), compiled in the early thirteenth century. Excavations at Great Wakering have recently uncovered a site of Middle Saxon occupation including a fragment of ornamented stone-sculpture, which may derive from the place named in the legend.

== Sources ==
- Bede, Historia Ecclesiastica Gentis Anglorum, Ed. and Trans. by B. Colgrave and R.A.B. Mynors (Oxford 1969).
- J. A. Giles, Roger of Wendover's Flowers of History, Translation, Vol.1 (London 1849).
- S. Plunkett, Suffolk in Anglo-Saxon Times (Stroud 2005).
- D. W. Rollason, The Mildrith Legend. A Study of Early Medieval Hagiography in England (Leicester 1982).
- F. M. Stenton, Anglo-Saxon England, 3rd Edition (Oxford 1971).
