= Swæfberht =

King of Kent

Swæfberht was a king of Kent, reigning jointly with Oswine, and possibly also Swæfheard. Swæfberht issued an undated charter that was witnessed by Oswine, and is probably the Gabertus who witnessed a charter issued by Oswine in July 689. He is usually combined with Swæfheard because of their similar names and overlapping dates, but multiple kingship was commonplace in Anglo-Saxon England, especially in Essex, where Swæfheard originated.

== See also ==
- List of monarchs of Kent
