= Adrian of Canterbury =

8th-century Berber abbot of St Augustine's, Canterbury and saint

Saint Adrian of Canterbury

Abbot
- Born: between 630–637
- Died: 709/710
- Venerated in: Eastern Orthodox Church, Catholic Church, Anglican Church
- Feast: 9 January

Adrian, also spelled Hadrian (born before 637, died 710), was a Berber scholar in Anglo-Saxon England and the abbot of Saint Peter's and Saint Paul's in Canterbury. He was a noted teacher and commentator of the Bible. Adrian was born between 630 and 637. According to Bede, he was "by nation an African", and thus a Berber from North Africa, and was abbot of a monastery near Naples, called Monasterium Niridanum (perhaps a mistake for Nisidanum, as being situated on the island of Nisida).

== Canterbury ==
He was twice offered the vacant archbishopric of Canterbury, by Pope Vitalian, but modestly declined the appointment. He first recommended that it should be given to Andrew, a monk belonging to a neighbouring monastery (monachum quemdam de vicino virginum monasterio), who also declined on the plea of advanced years. Then, when the offer was again made to Adrian, he introduced to the pontiff his friend Theodore of Tarsus, who then chanced to be at Rome, and who consented to undertake the charge. Vitalian, however, stipulated that Adrian should accompany the new archbishop to Britain. He gave as his reasons that Adrian, having twice before made a journey into Gaul, knew the road and the mode of travelling.

The two set out from Rome on 27 May 668, and proceeding by sea to Marseille, crossed the country to Arles, where they remained with John, the archbishop, until they got passports from Ebroin, who ruled that part of Gaul as Mayor of the Palace for the minor king Clotaire III. Having then made their way together to the north of France, they parted company, and went severally to reside for the winter, Theodore with Agilbert, bishop of Paris, Adrian first with Emmon, bishop of Sens, and afterwards with Faro, bishop of Meaux. Theodore, being sent for in the following spring by King Ecgberht of Kent, was allowed to take his departure, and he reached England at the end of May 669; but Adrian was detained by order of Ebroin, who is said to have suspected him of being an emissary of the Greek emperor sent to stir up troubles against the kingdom of the Franks.

At length, however, the tyrant became convinced that there was no ground for this notion, and Adrian was permitted to proceed to England, where, immediately on his arrival, he was made abbot of the monastery of Saints Peter and Paul (afterwards called Saint Augustine's) at Canterbury, an appointment which was in conformity with instructions given by the pope to Theodore. Such is the account given in the Ecclesiastical History (iv. 1.). Adrian was known to be a man learned in the Bible, as well as in Greek and Latin, and an excellent administrator. Under his direction the abbey came to have substantial, far-reaching influence.

In another account, also attributed to Bede, in his Lives of the Abbots of Wearmouth, it is stated that Adrian was not made abbot until after the resignation of Benedict Biscop, who is made to have accompanied Theodore all the way from Rome, and to have been immediately on their arrival appointed to this place, which he appears to have held for about two years. The facts in the two relations are not perhaps absolutely irreconcilable; but they are strangely dissimilar in manner, and in the circumstances which they respectively notice, to have come from the same pen.

Bede describes Adrian (or Hadrian, as he calls him in the Ecclesiastical History), as not only a distinguished theologian, but eminently accomplished in secular learning; he and Theodore, we are told, traversing all parts of the island, gathered multitudes of scholars around them wherever they appeared, and employed themselves daily with equal diligence and success in instructing those who flocked to them not only in the truths of religion but in the several branches of science and literature then cultivated. Bede particularly mentions the metrical art, astronomy, and arithmetic (which may be considered as representing what we should now call rhetoric and the belles lettres, physical science, and mathematics); and he adds, that while he wrote (in the early part of the eighth century), there still remained some of the pupils of Theodore and Adrian, who spoke the Greek and Latin languages as readily as their native tongue. A record of the teaching of Theodore and Adrian is preserved in the Leiden Glossary.

To the flourishing state of learning thus introduced into England, and for a short time maintained, King Alfred appears to allude in the preface to his translation of Pope Gregory I's Liber Pastoralis Curae, in the latter part of the ninth century, where he says that it often came into his mind what wise men there were in the country, both laymen and ecclesiastics, in a former age; how the clergy in those happy times were diligent both to teach and to study, and how foreigners then came hither to acquire learning and wisdom; whereas now, in his own day, if any Englishman desired to make himself a scholar, he was obliged to go abroad for instruction.

== Death ==
Adrian, long surviving his friend the archbishop, is said to have lived for 39 years after he came to England, continuing until his death to preside over the monastery at Canterbury. (Bede, Historia ecclesiastica gentis Anglorum iv. 1, 2.; and Vita Abbatum Wiramuth., in Smith's Beda, p. 293.; W. Malmes. De Pontif. p. 340.) He died in 709 and was buried in his monastery. He came to be regarded as a saint and his relics were redeposited in the new monastery on 9 January 1091, which is now his feast day.

== See also ==
- Noble Communion and Holy Apostolic Order of St Hadrian of Canterbury, part of the Apostolic Pastoral Congress
- Saint Adrian of Canterbury, patron saint archive

== Sources ==
- Long, George. The Biographical Dictionary of the Society for the Diffusion of Useful Knowledge. London: Longman, Brown, Green & Longmans, 1842-1844. 4 vols.
- Attwater, Donald and Catherine Rachel John. The Penguin Dictionary of Saints. 3rd edition. New York: Penguin Books, 1993. ISBN 0-14-051312-4.
