= Oswine of Kent =

King of the Anglo-Saxon Kingdom of Kent

Oswine

King of Kent
- Reign: 688 – 690

Oswine was king of Kent, reigning jointly with Swæfberht and Swæfheard from 688 till 690.

Oswine is known from charters: one of which, is dated 26 January 690, and was witnessed by Swæfheard, and implies Oswine's descent from Eormenred; and a third, which is undated, but again witnessed by Swæfheard, expresses Oswine's gratitude for his restoration to the kingdom of his fathers (gratias refero miserenti Deo omnipotenti qui confirmauit me in regno patrum meorum et dedit mihi domum cognationis mee).

== Background ==
After the death of Eadric of Kent, Kent was in turmoil. Cædwalla of Wessex invaded in 686 and installed his brother Mul of Kent as king. Mul was killed in an uprising a year later. Cædwalla returned and laid waste to Kent leaving it in a state of chaos. He may have ruled Kent directly after this second invasion. However, he abdicated in 688 and went on a pilgrimage to Rome, possibly because he was dying of wounds suffered while fighting on the Isle of Wight.

== Charters ==
Oswine was of the royal house of Kent. Gordon Ward, writing in Archaeologia Cantiana suggests that Oswine was a grandson of Eormenred of Kent, possibly the son of Æthelred of East Kent. A charter of January 690 granting land in Sturry to Æbba, abbess of Minster-in-Thanet states that they were closely related ("carnali propinquitate proxime"). It also indicates that Oswine had the support of Æthelred of Mercia.

Oswine appears to have ruled jointly with Swæfheard, son of Sæbbi of Essex, Oswine ruling the eastern half of Kent.

In a charter of July 689, Oswine, king of Kent, granted to St Peter's Minster and Abbot Hadrian 1 sulung (aratrum) of iron-bearing land, formerly belonging to the royal vill at Lyminge, Kent.

== See also ==
- List of monarchs of Kent
- Chronology of Kentish Kings
