= Swæfheard =

King of the Anglo-Saxon Kingdom of Kent

Swæfheard was a king of Kent, reigning jointly with Oswine, Wihtred, and possibly Swæfberht.

Swæfheard's charter dated 1 March 689, in the second year of his reign, identifies his father as Sæbbi, King of Essex (ac consensu patris mei Sebbe regis). He witnessed two charters of Oswine, one of which is dated 27 January 690.

Swæfheard apparently ruled West Kent as a sub king under his father, while Oswine ruled the eastern half. According to Bede, Swæfheard was still reigning jointly with Withred in July 692.

== See also ==
- List of monarchs of Kent
- Chronology of Kentish Kings
