= Theodore of Tarsus =

Archbishop of Canterbury from 668 to 690, Christian saint

Saint Theodore of Tarsus
- Archbishop of Canterbury
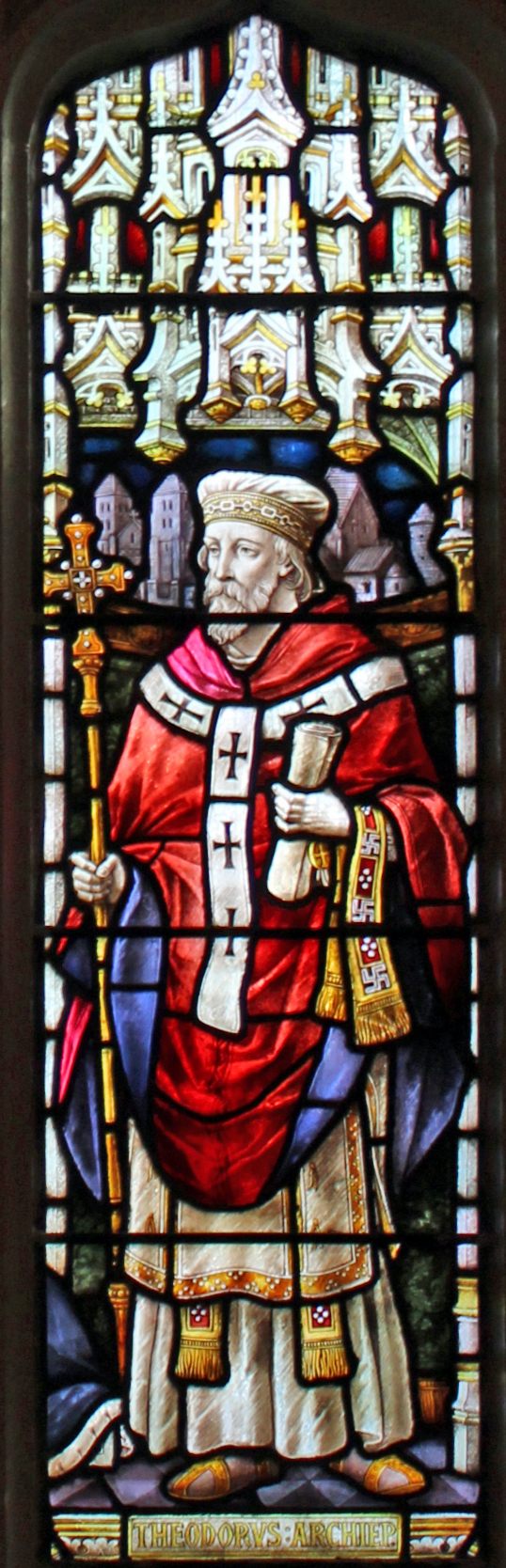
- Stained glass depiction of Theodore at St John the Evangelist Church, Liverpool
- Term ended: 19 September 690
- Predecessor: Wighard
- Successor: Berhtwald

Orders
- Consecration: 26 March 668

Personal details
- Born: 602 Tarsus, Byzantine Empire
- Died: 19 September 690
- Buried: Canterbury

Sainthood
- Feast day: 19 September
- Venerated in: Catholic Church; Eastern Orthodox Church; Anglican Communion
- Canonized: Pre-Congregation

Theodore of Tarsus (Greek: Θεόδωρος Ταρσοῦ; 602 – 19 September 690) was Archbishop of Canterbury from 668 to 690. Theodore grew up in Tarsus, but fled to Constantinople after the Muslims conquered Tarsus. After studying there, he relocated to Rome and was later installed as the Archbishop of Canterbury on the orders of Pope Vitalian. Accounts of his life appear in two 8th-century texts. Theodore is best known for his reform of the English Church and establishment of a school in Canterbury.

== Sources ==
Theodore's life can be divided into the time before his arrival in Britain as Archbishop of Canterbury, and his archiepiscopate. Until recently, scholarship on Theodore had focused on only the latter period since it is attested in Bede's Ecclesiastical History of the English (c 731), and also in Stephen of Ripon's Vita Sancti Wilfrithi (early 700s), whereas no source directly mentions Theodore's earlier activities. However, Bernard Bischoff and Michael Lapidge reconstructed his earlier life based on a study of texts produced by his Canterbury School.

== Early life ==
Theodore was of Greek descent and was born in Tarsus in Cilicia, a Greek-speaking diocese of the Byzantine Empire. Theodore's childhood saw devastating wars between Byzantium and the Persian Sassanid Empire, which resulted in the capture of Antioch, Damascus, and Jerusalem in 613–614. Persian forces captured Tarsus when Theodore was 11 or 12 years old, and there is evidence that Theodore had experience of Persian culture. It is most likely that he studied at Antioch, the historic home of a distinctive school of exegesis, of which he was a proponent. Theodore also knew Syriac culture, language and literature, and may even have travelled to Edessa. The Syriac Acts of St. Milus of Persia, which was incorporated into the Old English Martyrology, was probably brought to England by Theodore.

Though a Greek could live under Persian rule, the Muslim conquests, which reached Tarsus in 637, certainly drove Theodore from Tarsus; unless he fled even earlier, Theodore would have been 35 years old when he left his birthplace. Having returned to the Eastern Roman Empire, he studied in the Byzantine capital of Constantinople, including the subjects of astronomy, ecclesiastical computus (calculation of the date of Easter), astrology, medicine, Roman civil law, Greek rhetoric and philosophy, and the use of the horoscope.

At some time before the 660s, Theodore had travelled west to Rome, where he lived with a community of Eastern monks, probably at the monastery of St. Anastasius. At this time, in addition to his already profound Greek intellectual inheritance, he became learned in Latin literature, both sacred and secular. The Synod of Whitby (664) having confirmed the decision in the Anglo-Saxon Church to follow Rome, in 667, when Theodore was aged 66, the see of Canterbury happened to fall vacant. Wighard, the man chosen to fill the post, unexpectedly died. Wighard had been sent to Pope Vitalian by Ecgberht, king of Kent, and Oswy, king of Northumbria, for consecration as archbishop. Following Wighard's death, Theodore was chosen by Vitalian upon the recommendation of Hadrian (later abbot of St. Peter's, Canterbury). Theodore was consecrated archbishop of Canterbury in Rome on 26 March 668, and sent to England with Hadrian, arriving on 27 May 669.

== Archbishop of Canterbury ==
Theodore conducted a survey of the English church, appointed various bishops to sees that had lain vacant for some time, and then called the Synod of Hertford (673) to institute reforms concerning the proper calculation of Easter, episcopal authority, itinerant monks, the regular convening of subsequent synods, marriage and prohibitions of consanguinity, and other matters. He also proposed subdividing the large diocese of Northumbria, a policy which brought him into conflict with Wilfrid, who had become Bishop of York in 664. Theodore deposed and expelled Wilfrid in 678, dividing his diocese in the aftermath. The conflict with Wilfrid was settled only in 686–687.

In 679 Aelfwine, the brother of King Ecgfrith of Northumbria, died in battle fighting against the Mercians. Theodore's intervention prevented the escalation of the war and resulted in peace between the two kingdoms, with King Æthelred of Mercia paying weregild compensation for Aelfwine's death.

== Canterbury School ==
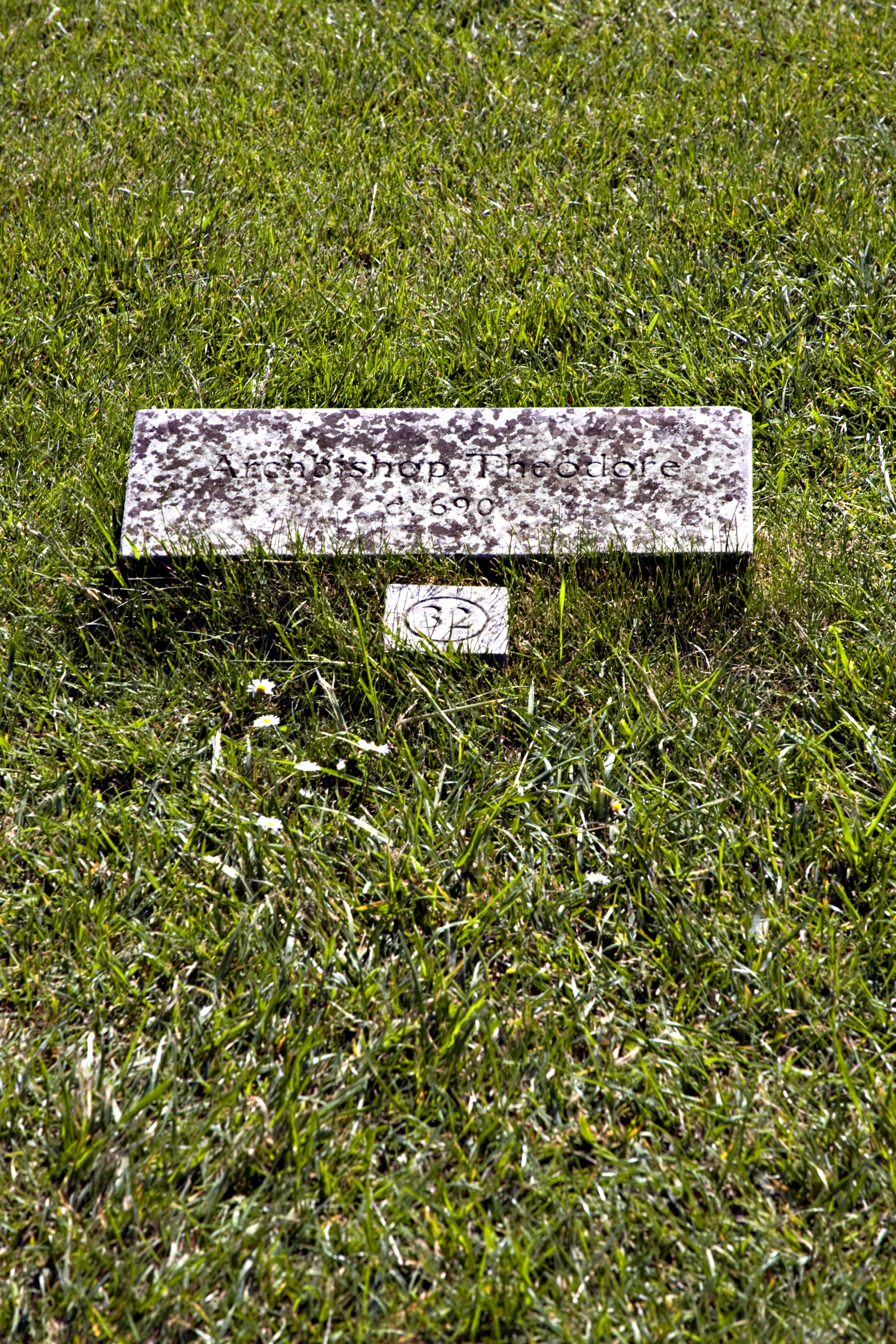
Gravesite of Theodore at St. Augustine's Abbey, Canterbury.

Theodore and Hadrian established a school in Canterbury, providing instruction in both Greek and Latin, resulting in a "golden age" of Anglo-Saxon scholarship:

They attracted a large number of students, into whose minds they poured the waters of wholesome knowledge day by day. In addition to instructing them in the Holy Scriptures, they also taught their pupils poetry, astronomy, and the calculation of the church calendar ... Never had there been such happy times as these since the English settled Britain.

Theodore also taught sacred music, introduced various texts, knowledge of Eastern saints, and may even have been responsible for the introduction of the Litany of the Saints, a major liturgical innovation, into the West. Some of his thoughts are accessible in the Biblical Commentaries, notes compiled by his students at the Canterbury School. Of immense interest is the text, recently attributed to him, called Laterculus Malalianus. Overlooked for many years, it was rediscovered in the 1990s, and has since been shown to contain numerous interesting elements reflecting Theodore's trans-Mediterranean formation. A record of the teaching of Theodore and Adrian is preserved in the Leiden Glossary.

Pupils from the school at Canterbury were sent out as Benedictine abbots in southern England, disseminating the curriculum of Theodore.

Theodore called other synods, in September 680 at Hatfield, Hertfordshire, confirming English orthodoxy in the Monothelite controversy, and circa 684 at Twyford, near Alnwick in Northumbria. Lastly, a penitential composed under his direction is still extant.

Theodore died in 690 at the age of 88, having held the archbishopric for twenty-two years. He was buried in Canterbury at the church known today as St Augustine's Abbey; at the time of his death it was called St. Peter's church.

== Veneration ==
Like the archbishops of Canterbury before him, Theodore is venerated as a saint; his saint's day is 19 September in the Orthodox Church, Catholic Church, and Anglican churches. He is also recorded on this day in the Roman Martyrology. Canterbury also recognises a feast of his ordination on 26 March.

Christian titles
| Preceded by Wighard (vacant four years) | Archbishop of Canterbury; 668–690 | Succeeded by Berhtwald |
