= Ecgberht of Kent =

King of Kent from 664 to 673

Ecgberht

King of Kent
- Reign: 14 July 664 – 4 July 673
- Predecessor: Eorcenberht
- Successor: Hlothhere
- Died: 4 July 673
- Issue: Eadric; Wihtred
- Father: Eorcenberht
- Religion: Chalcedonian Christianity

Ecgberht I (also spelled Egbert) (died 4 July 673) was a king of Kent (664–673), succeeding his father Eorcenberht.

He may have still been a child when he became king following his father's death on 14 July 664, because his mother Seaxburh was recorded as having been regent.

Ecgberht's court seems to have had many diplomatic and ecclesiastic contacts. He hosted Wilfrid and Benedict Biscop, and provided escorts to Archbishop Theodore and Abbot Adrian of Canterbury for their travels in Gaul.

The various versions of the Kentish Royal Legend state that, spurred on by his adviser Thunor, he had his cousins Æthelred and Æthelberht (sons of his uncle Eormenred) killed, and so had to pay Weregild to their sister Domne Eafe, enabling her to build a Monastery at Thanet; this may reflect a dynastic struggle that ended in the success of Eorcenberht's line. The two murdered princes were later venerated as saints at Ramsey Abbey in Huntingdonshire.

A charter records Ecgberht's patronage of the monastery at Chertsey Abbey in Surrey.

Ecgberht was succeeded by his brother Hlothhere, who was in turn succeeded by Ecgberht's sons, Eadric and still later Wihtred.

== See also ==
- List of monarchs of Kent

== Sources ==
- Bede, The Ecclesiastical History of the English People
- Kirby, D. P. (1991). The Earliest English Kings. London: Unwin Hyman. pp. 43–44. ISBN 0-04-445691-3.

Regnal titles
Preceded by Eorcenberht	King of Kent; 664–673 with Seaxburh (664-?)	Succeeded by Hlothhere
