= Hlothhere of Kent =

King of Kent from 673 to 685

Hlothhere

King of Kent
- Reign: 4 July 673 – 6 February 685
- Predecessor: Ecgberht I
- Successor: Eadric
- Died: 6 February 685
- Father: Eorcenberht
- Mother: Seaxburh
- Religion: Chalcedonian Christianity

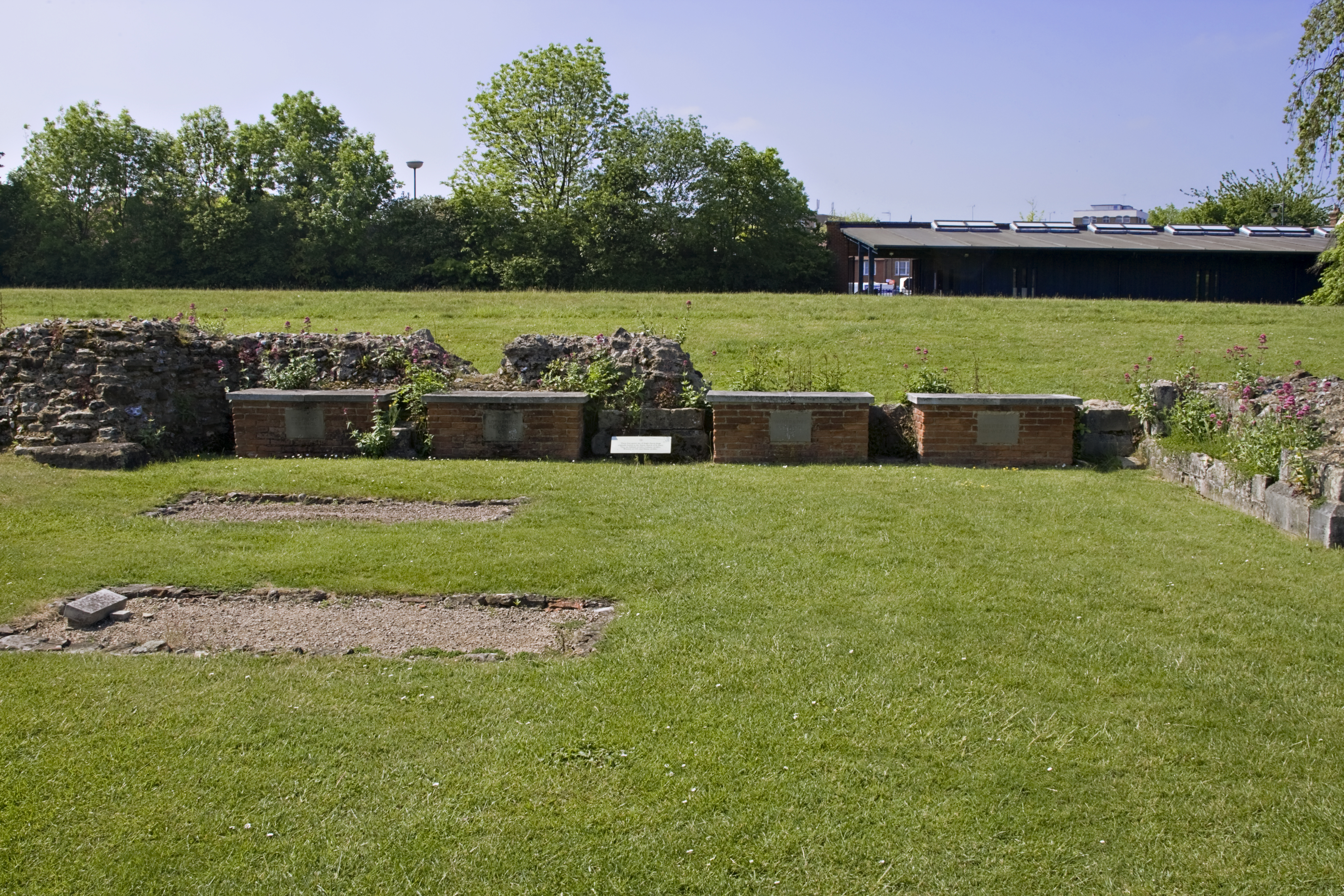
Gravesite at St Augustine's Abbey in Canterbury of four Kentish kings. Hlothhere's is the second from the left.

Hlothhere (Old English: Hloþhere; died 6 February 685) was a King of Kent who ruled from 673 to 685.

Hlothhere succeeded his brother Ecgberht I in 673. His parents were Eorcenberht of Kent and Seaxburh of Ely, the daughter of Anna of East Anglia. In 676, the Mercian king Æthelred invaded Kent and caused great destruction; according to Bede, even churches and monasteries were not spared, and Rochester was laid waste. The damage was so great that Putta, Bishop of Rochester, resigned. So too did his successor, Cwichhelm, due to the poverty of the see.

Hlothhere's rule survived this onslaught, however. He appears for a time to have reigned jointly with his nephew Eadric, son of Ecgberht I, since a code of laws still extant was issued under both their names. A law code, the Law of Hlothhere and Eadric, is jointly attributed to him and his successor Eadric. In 685, Eadric went into exile and led the South Saxons against Hlothhere, who was defeated and died of his wounds.

The information is derived from Bede, but Hlothhere is the earliest Kentish king for whom genuine charters survive. One charter known from a 15th-century copy, is precisely dated to 1 April 675 in the first year of Hlothhere's reign, which conflicts with the accession date attributed to him by Bede. The Charter of King Hlothhere of Kent, 679 survives in its original form. Two further charters attributed to Hlothere (S1648, S1648a), appear to have been altered copies of charters of Swæfheard and Swæfberht. (Kelly 1995).

== See also ==
- Charter of 679
- List of monarchs of Kent
- Chronology of Kentish Kings

Regnal titles
Preceded by Ecgberht I	King of Kent; 673–685 with Eadric	Succeeded by Eadric
