= Kingdom of Kent =

Early English kingdom (c.455-825)

Kingdom of the Kentish Cent rīċe (Old English)
- c. 455–825
- The Kingdom of Kent
- Status: Independent kingdom (c. 455–764, 769–785, 796–798); Client state of Mercia (764–769, 785–796, 798–825)
- Official languages: Kentish Old English
- Religion: Anglo-Saxon paganism (before 7th century); Chalcedonian Christianity (after 7th century)
- Government: Monarchy
- King
  - ?–488: Hengist (first)
  - 866–871: Æthelred (last)
- Legislature: Witenagemot
- Historical era: Heptarchy
  - Established: c. 455
  - Full integration into crown of Wessex: 825
- Currency: sceat, thrymsa
Preceded by	Succeeded by
Sub-Roman Britain	Wessex

The Kingdom of the Kentish, today referred to as the Kingdom of Kent, was an early medieval English kingdom in present-day South East England. It existed from either the fifth or the sixth century AD until it was fully absorbed into the Kingdom of Wessex in the mid-9th century and later into the Kingdom of England in the early 10th century.

Under the preceding Romano-British administration the area of Kent faced repeated attacks from seafaring raiders during the fourth century AD. It is likely that Germanic-speaking foederati were invited to settle in the area as mercenaries. Following the end of Roman administration in 410, further linguistically Germanic tribal groups moved into the area, as testified by both archaeological evidence and Late Anglo-Saxon textual sources. The primary ethnic group to settle in the area appears to have been the Jutes: they established their Kingdom in East Kent and may initially have been under the dominion of the Kingdom of Francia. It has been argued that an East Saxon or Middle Saxon community initially settled in West Kent and merged with the expanding kingdom of East Kent in the sixth century, but this is uncertain.

The earliest recorded king of Kent was Æthelberht, who, as bretwalda, wielded significant influence over other Anglo-Saxon kings in the late sixth century. The Christianization of the Anglo-Saxons began in Kent during Æthelberht's reign with the arrival of the monk Augustine of Canterbury and his Gregorian mission in 597.

Kent was one of the seven kingdoms of the so-called Anglo-Saxon heptarchy, but it lost its independence in the 8th century when it became a sub-kingdom of Mercia. In the 9th century it became a sub-kingdom of Wessex, and in the 10th century it became part of the unified Kingdom of England that was created under the leadership of Wessex. Its name has been carried forward ever since as the county of Kent.

Knowledge of Anglo-Saxon Kent comes from scholarly study of Late Anglo-Saxon texts such as the Anglo-Saxon Chronicle and the Ecclesiastical History of the English People, as well as archaeological evidence such as that left by early medieval cemeteries and settlements, and toponymical (place-name) evidence.

== Decline of Romano-British Kent ==
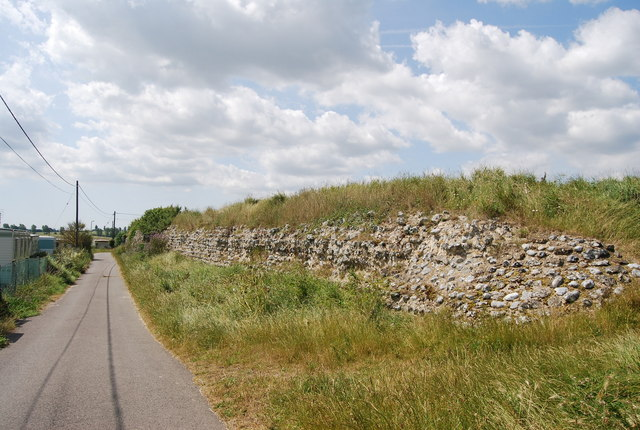
Roman fort wall at Regulbium

In the Romano-British period, the area of modern Kent that lay east of the River Medway was a civitas known as Cantiaca, home to the Celtic Cantiaci tribe. Its name had been taken from an older Common Brittonic place-name, Cantium ("corner of land" or "land on the edge") used in the preceding pre-Roman Iron Age, although the extent of this tribal area is unknown.

During the late third and fourth centuries, Roman Britain had been raided repeatedly by Franks, Saxons, Picts, and Scots. As the closest part of Britain to mainland Europe, it is likely that Kent would have experienced many attacks from seafaring raiders, resulting in the construction of four Saxon Shore Forts along the Kentish coast: Regulbium, Rutupiae, Dubris, and Portus Lemanis. It is also likely that Germanic-speaking mercenaries from northern Gaul, known as foederati, would have been hired to supplement official Roman troops during this period, with land in Kent as payment. These foederati would have assimilated into Romano-British culture, making it difficult to distinguish them archaeologically.

There is evidence that over the fourth and early fifth centuries, rural villas were abandoned, suggesting that the Romano-British elite were moving to the comparative safety of fortified urban centres. However, urban centres also witnessed decline; Canterbury evidenced a declining population and reduced activity from the late third century onward, while Dover was abandoned by the end of the fourth century. In 407, the Roman legions left Britain in order to deal with incursions into the Empire's continental heartlands.

In 410, the Roman Emperor Honorius sent a letter to his British subjects announcing that they must thenceforth look after their own defence and could no longer rely on the imperial military to protect them. According to the Anglo-Saxon Chronicle, produced in late Anglo-Saxon England and not considered an accurate record of events in the fifth century, in 418 many Romans left Britain via Kent, taking much of their wealth with them. This may represent a memory of a genuine exodus of the Roman aristocracy.

== Early Jutish Kent ==
=== Jutish migration: 410–499 ===
According to archaeologist Martin Welch, the fifth century witnessed "a radical transformation of what became Kent, politically, socially and in terms of physical landscape". There has been much debate as to the scale of Jutish migration; some see it as a mass migration in which large numbers of Germanic peoples left northern Europe to settle in Britain, pushing the native British population to western Britain or Brittany; others have argued that only a small warrior elite came over, dominating (or even enslaving) the Romano-British population, who then began using the Old English language and material culture of the newcomers. Currently, many scholars accept that there was significant regional variation, with the former view being more applicable in the south and east and the latter in the north and west.

In Kent, archaeological and historical evidence suggests that a large-scale immigration of Germanic peoples did indeed take place. However, some of the Romano-British population likely remained, as the Roman name for the area, Cantiaca, influenced the name of the new Jutish kingdom, the Cantware ("dwellers of Kent").

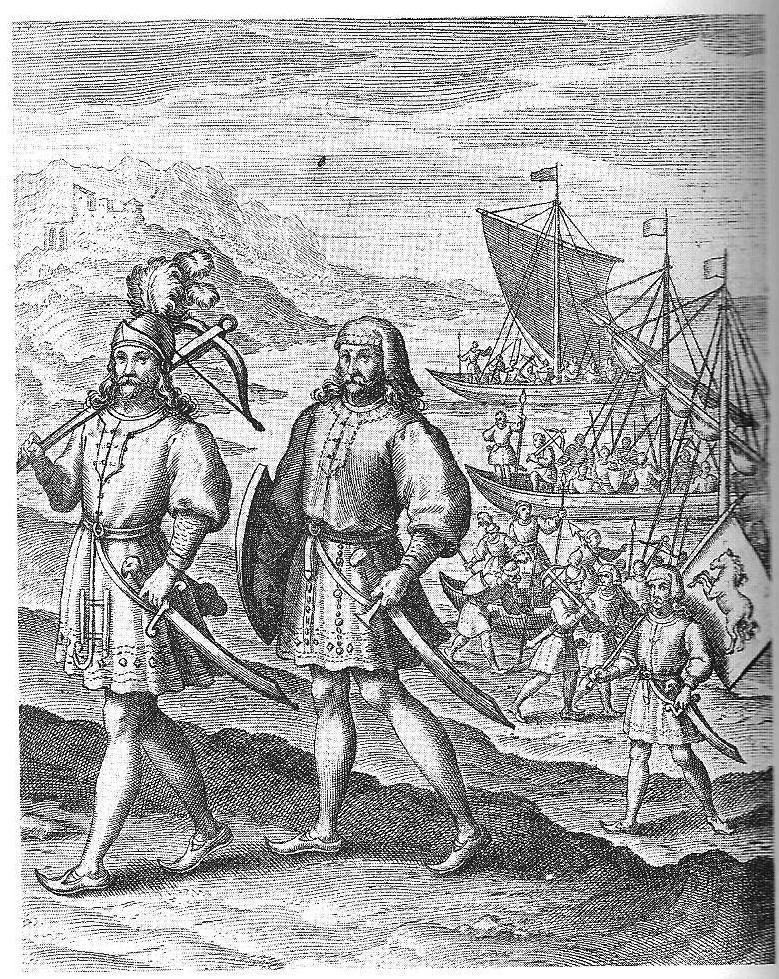
Hengest and Horsa, from A Restitution of Decayed Intelligence by Richard Verstegan (1605)

The Germanic migration to Britain is noted in textual sources from the late Anglo-Saxon period, most notably Bede's Ecclesiastical History of the English People and the Anglo-Saxon Chronicle; both rely on oral histories from the fifth century, and were attempts to establish origin myths that would justify the politics of the time. According to the Anglo-Saxon Chronicle, a "king of the Britons" known as Vortigern invited two Germanic leaders, Hengist and Horsa ("stallion" and "horse"), to Britain to help defend against Pictish raiders. After arriving at Ypwinesfleot (Ebba's Creek, modern Ebbsfleet near Ramsgate) in Kent in 449, Hengist and Horsa led the defeat of the Picts before turning on the British and inviting more Germanic tribes to colonise Britain. Among these were the Old Saxons, the Angles, and the Jutes; the latter settled in Kent and the Isle of Wight, establishing the peoples known as the Cantware and Wihtware.

According to the Chronicle, in 455 Hengist and Horsa fought Vortigern at Ægelesthrep (probably Aylesford in Kent), in which battle Horsa was killed. Hengist succeeded him as king, followed in turn by his son Æsc. In 456 Hengest and Æsc battled the Britons at Crecganford (probably Crayford). The Britons then fled Kent for their London stronghold. A similar account is provided in Bede's Ecclesiastical History: that the people of Kent and Isle of Wight were descended from Jutish settlers, and that Horsa was killed in battle against the Britons, adding that his body was buried in east Kent. The accuracy of these accounts is questioned; S. E. Kelly states that "the legendary details are easy to dismiss". Scholars often view Hengist and Horsa as mythological figures borrowed from folk tradition, to legitimise rulers in the Mid-to-Late Anglo-Saxon period. (Note: There is disagreement about the extent to which the legend can be treated as fact. For example, Barbara Yorke says "Recent detailed studies [. . .] have confirmed that these accounts are largely mythic and that any reliable oral tradition which they may have embodied has been lost in the conventions of the origin-legend format", but Richard Fletcher says of Hengist that "there is no good reason for doubting his existence", and James Campbell adds that "although the origins of such annals are deeply mysterious, and suspect, they cannot be simply discarded".)

The incoming Germanic peoples settled on the prime agricultural land of the Romano-Britons; particularly the foothills to the north of the downs and Holmesdale south of the downs escarpment. It is likely that they complemented agriculture with animal husbandry, but with nearby coasts and rivers it is also likely that they engaged in fishing and trading. The Anglo-Saxons made use of pre-existing prehistoric and Roman road systems, with 85% of cemeteries being located within 1.2 km of a Roman road, a navigable river or the coast, and the remaining 15% being close to ancient trackways. Little archaeological evidence of these early settlements exists, but one prominent example is a grubenhaus at Lower Warbank, Keston that was built atop the site of a former Roman villa, adjacent to a Romano-British trackway through the North Downs. Fifth-century ceramics have also been found at a number of villa sites around Kent, suggesting reoccupation of these locations during this period.

The density of Anglo-Saxon cemeteries and artefacts in Kent in the early 5th century is different from the more sporadic location of fifth century Anglo-Saxon cemeteries in the rest of Britain and suggest either an exceptionally heavy Anglo-Saxon settlement, or continued settlement beginning at an early date, or both. By the late 5th century there were additional Anglo-Saxon cemeteries, some of them adjacent to earlier ones, but with a large expansion in other areas, and now including the southern coast of Sussex. In East Kent, fifth century cemeteries mostly comprise solely of inhumation burials, with a distinct Kentish character. Conversely, in West Kent cemeteries such Orpington mix cremations with inhumations, which is more typical of Saxon cemeteries north of the River Thames. This may suggest that West Kent at this point was independent of East Kent, and part of the Kingdom of the East Saxons north of the Thames Estuary.

=== Development and westward expansion: 500–590 ===
In the sixth century the Kingdom of Kent had some relationship with the Merovingian-governed Kingdom of Francia, which was then extending its influence in northwestern Europe. Textual sources suggest that Kent may have been under Merovingian control for part of this century. Archeological evidence of Frankish material culture from this period has been found in Kent, but not in other areas of lowland Britain, suggesting a trade monopoly with the Frankish kingdom.

Sixth century Kentish artefacts have been found in continental Europe, in particular in the areas of modern Charente, western Normandy, the Rhineland, Frisia, Thuringia, and southern Scandinavia. They are relatively absent between the Sein and the Somme across the English Channel from the Saxons in Sussex, suggesting that trade was established between particular tribal or ethnic groups rather than by geography. There is also archaeological evidence of Kentish trade links in Hampshire and the Isle of Wight, and copies or imitations appearing in cemeteries further afield, in areas such as Wiltshire and Cambridgeshire.

Archaeological evidence suggests that at some point in the sixth century, East Kent annexed West Kent. To the south lay the Weald, a dense forest of no value to the Kentish elite, leaving the fertile area west of the kingdom attractive for conquest, particularly the Darenth Valley and the dip slopes of the North Downs to the west of the Medway. During the sixth century, while the archaeological record in Kent includes items from Jutland, the dominant influence became Frankish.

=== Established kingdom and Christianisation: 597–650 ===
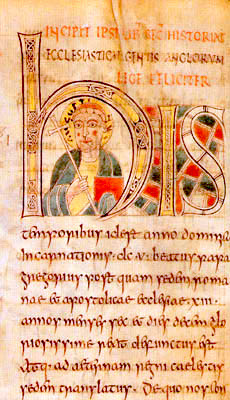
A putative early illustration of Augustine

Firmly in the control of an elite class, Kent is the first Anglo-Saxon kingdom to appear in the historical record in 597. The monk Bede refers to Kent as ruled by Æthelberht at this period, making him the earliest reliably attested Anglo-Saxon monarch. Bede states that Æthelberht was a bretwalda who controlled everything south of the River Humber, including other kingdoms. The Anglo-Saxon Chronicle refers to wars in sixth-century Britain, but most were in the west and did not affect Kent; the one exception was a battle between the Kentish and West Saxons in 568, during which Æthelberht's forces were pushed back into Kent. Æthelberht's reign also produced the Law of Æthelberht, the oldest surviving text in Old English.

According to Bede, the Christianization of Anglo-Saxon England began in Kent under Æthelberht's reign when the Benedictine monk Augustine arrived on the Ebbsfleet peninsula in 597, bringing the Gregorian mission with him. Æthelberht's Frankish wife, Bertha, was already a Christian, with Æthelberht himself converting a few years later. Æthelberht's attempts to convert Rædwald demonstrate the links between the Kingdom of Kent and Kingdom of East Anglia, with shared North Sea interests.

During this period, Anglo-Saxon kings moved around their kingdoms continually, subsisting on goods from the local populations and reciprocating with gifts. Various seventh and eighth century documents attest to the fact that Kent was governed by two kings, possibly a dominant one in the east and a subordinate in the west, perhaps reflecting the earlier divide. Trade with Francia was extensive in the seventh and eighth centuries and appears to have been under control of the kings of Kent, through the ports of Dover, Sarre and Fordwich.

This period witnessed the end of furnished burial, marked archaeologically by less regional distinctiveness of grave goods and more artefacts decorated in the Salin Style II motifs. It also saw the emergence of elite burials with far greater wealth than others; notable Kentish examples have been found at Sarre Anglo-Saxon cemetery and the Kingston Barrow cemetery, while the elite Taplow burial in modern Buckinghamshire also contained Kentish characteristics, suggesting a potential Kentish influence in that region.

== Middle and late Anglo-Saxon Kent ==
=== Decline and Mercian domination: 650–825 ===
In the seventh century, Kent's power waned as that of Mercia and Northumbria grew, but it remained the fourth wealthiest kingdom in England, according to the Tribal Hidage with 15,000 hides of land recorded in the seventh or eighth century. However the period was tumultuous for the Kentish royal family; Kent was ruled by Ecgberht from 664 to 673, but between 664 and 667 two royal cousins, Æthelred and Æthelberht, were killed at Eastry royal hall, perhaps because they were a threat to Ecgberht. Ecgberht was succeeded by his brother, Hlothere, who ruled from 674 to 686 before being overthrown and killed by one of Ecgberht's sons, Eadric, who had allied with the South Saxons; Eadric then ruled until 687.

In the late seventh century, Kent gradually came to be dominated by Mercia. There had been a Kentish royal hall and reeve in Lundenwic until at least the 680s, but the city then passed into Mercian hands. The loss of Lundenwic probably broke Kent's monopoly on cross-Channel trade and its control of the Thames, eroding its economic influence. According to Bede's later account, in 676 the Mercian king Æthelred I led an attack that destroyed many Kentish churches. Mercia's control of Kent increased in the following decades; by 689–690 East Saxon kings under Mercian overlordship were active in West Kent, and there are records attesting that Æthelred arbitrated on the income of the Christian communities at Minster-in-Thanet and Reculver, indicating strong Mercian control over the east of the kingdom too.

In 686 Kent was conquered by Cædwalla of Wessex; within a year, Cædwalla's brother Mul was killed in a Kentish revolt, and Cædwalla returned to devastate the kingdom again. After this, Kent fell into a state of disorder. The Mercians backed a client king named Oswine, but he seems to have reigned for only about two years, after which Wihtred became king. Wihtred, famous for the Law of Wihtred, did a great deal to restore the kingdom after the devastation and tumult of the preceding years, and in 694 he made peace with the West Saxons by paying compensation for the killing of Mul.

Records of Kent following the death of Wihtred in 725 are fragmented and obscure. For forty years, two or even three kings typically ruled simultaneously. This division may have made Kent the first target of the rising power of Offa of Mercia: in 764, he gained supremacy over Kent and ruled it through client kings. By the early 770s, it appears that Offa was attempting to rule Kent directly, and a rebellion followed. A battle was fought at Otford in 776, and although the outcome is unknown, records of following years suggest that the rebels prevailed; Egbert II and later Ealhmund seem to have ruled independently of Offa for nearly a decade thereafter. This did not last, however, as Offa firmly re-established his authority over Kent in 785.

Religious centres of this period, minsters containing a church, were often far larger than lay settlements, with access to many resources and trade links; the Minster-in-Thanet was recorded as possessing three trade ships.

The seventh century saw the reintroduction of masonry in Anglo-Saxon England, primarily for churches. The earliest churches in the region have been termed the "Kentish Group" and reflect both Italian and Frankish influences in their design; early examples include St Pancras, St Mary, and St Peter and St Paul, all part of St. Augustine's monastery in Canterbury, as well as St. Andrews in Rochester and St Mary in Lyminge.

In the late seventh century, the earliest charters appear, giving estate boundaries, and showing reclamation of land, for use by livestock, from the Wantsum Channel and Romney Marsh. The Ebbsfleet watermill near Gravesend in West Kent, dated to circa 700, also reflects new uses of the landscape.

Canterbury grew into the economic and political centre of Kent during the seventh century, as evidenced by rubbish pits, metalworking, timber halls, and sunken-feature buildings from the period. Intensive development was also present at Dover, and possibly at Rochester, although archaeological evidence is lacking. It is known that both Canterbury and Rochester were the home to major mints in this period, primarily producing silver sceattas. This suggests that from the seventh century onward, kings in Kent were establishing control over the kingdom's economic structure.

During the eighth and ninth centuries, a number of fortified earthworks, most notably Wansdyke and Offa's Dyke, were constructed as barriers between the warring kingdoms; the Faestendic passing through the Cray Valley and the routeway that has since become the A25 were likely Kentish earthworks of this period designed to protect the kingdom. Evidence for such militarisation might also be seen in the Rochester Bridge burdens, documented from the 790s, which lay out the obligation for the Roman bridge across the River Medway to be maintained, which would be vital for allowing Kentish troops to cross the river.

After King Ealhmund presumably died shortly after witnessing a charter in 784, his son Egbert was driven out of Kent and into exile by Offa of Mercia. It is clear from charters that Offa was in control of Kent by 785. Rather than just acting as overlord of his new possession, he attempted to annex it or at least reduce its importance by creating a new diocese in Mercia at Lichfield, possibly because the archbishop of Canterbury Jænberht refused to crown his son Ecgfrith. Jænberht resigned a part of his bishopric and the pro-Mercian Hygeberht was chosen by King Offa to replace him "through enmity conceived against the venerable Jænberht and the Kentish people", according to Offa's eventual successor Coenwulf. In 796 Offa died, and in this moment of Mercian weakness a Kentish rebellion under Eadbert Praen temporarily succeeded. Offa's eventual successor, Coenwulf, reconquered Kent in 798, however, and installed his brother Cuthred as king. After Cuthred's death in 807, Coenwulf ruled Kent directly.

Mercian authority was replaced by that of Wessex in 825, following the latter's victory at the Battle of Ellendun, and the Mercian client king Baldred was expelled.

=== Viking attacks: 825–1066 ===
The Anglo-Saxon Chronicle records that Kent was first attacked by Viking raiders in the late eighth century. Kent and southeast England would have been an attractive target because of its wealthy minsters, often located on exposed coastal locations. In 804, the nuns of Lyminge were granted refuge in Canterbury to escape the attackers, while in 811 Kentish forces gathered to repel a Viking army based on the Isle of Sheppey. Further recorded attacks occurred on Sheppey in 835, through Romney Marsh in 841, in Rochester in 842, Canterbury (Battle of Aclea) and Sandwich (Battle of Sandwich) in 851, Thanet in 853, and across Kent in 865. Kent was also attractive for its easy access to major land and sea routes. By 811, it is recorded that Vikings built fortifications on the Kentish north coast, and over-wintered their armies on Thanet in 851–852 and Sheppey in 854–855. At this point, Canterbury and Rochester still had Roman walls that could have been refurbished, but they were nevertheless attacked by the Vikings: Rochester in 842, Canterbury in 851, and Rochester again in 885, when they laid siege until it was liberated by Alfred's army. The Burghal Hidage lists the construction of the Eorpenburnam fort, possibly Castle Toll. Hoards have been found, particularly around the West Kent coast, that might have been wealth hidden from the Vikings.

In 892, when southern England was united under Alfred the Great, Kent was on the brink of disaster. Alfred had defeated Guthrum the Old and allowed Vikings by treaty to settle in East Anglia and the North East. However, other Danes were still on the move. Haesten, a highly experienced warrior-leader, had mustered huge forces in northern France having besieged Paris and taken Brittany. As many as 350 Viking ships sailed from Boulogne to the south coast of Kent in 892. Between 5000 and 10,000 men, with their families and horses, came up Limen estuary (the east-west route of the Royal Military Canal in reclaimed Romney Marsh) and attacked a Saxon fort near St Rumwold's church, Bonnington, killing all inside. They moved on and over the next year built a fortress at Appledore. Hearing of this, Danes in East Anglia and elsewhere then rose against Alfred. They raided Kent from Appledore, razing a large settlement, Seleberhtes Cert (present-day Great Chart near Ashford). They moved further inland and engaged in numerous battles with the English, but after four years they gave up. Some retreated to East Anglia and others fled to northern France and settled in Normandy.

A large Viking army led by Thorkell the Tall besieged Canterbury in 1011, culminating in the pillage of the city and the eventual murder of Archbishop Alphege, on 19 April 1012, despite Thorkell's attempts to keep him alive to sell him for ransom.

== See also ==
- Finglesham Anglo-Saxon cemetery
- Kings of Kent
- Kentish Royal Legend
- Updown early medieval cemetery
  - Updown Girl
- White horse of Kent
