= Bodleian Library, MSS Bodley 340 and 342 =

Old English homiliary

Bodley 340 and 342
- Oxford, Bodleian Library, MSS Bodley 340, 342
- Type: codices, a homiliary in two volumes
- Date: early 11th century, with later additions
- Place of origin: Canterbury or Rochester
- Language(s): Old English, Latin, Old Dutch
- Material: parchment
- Script: square Anglo-Saxon minuscule (original text)
- Contents: homilies, largely by Ælfric of Eynsham
- Additions: pen trials (including Hebban olla vogala), annotations and glosses
- Previously kept: Rochester Cathedral Priory

Oxford, Bodleian Library, MSS Bodley 340 and 342 are two medieval manuscripts kept at the Bodleian Library in Oxford. They date from the early 11th century and contain a collection of Old English homilies in two volumes. From the middle of the 11th century, they were kept in Rochester, Kent. They are particularly notable for containing medieval pen trials by monks from Normandy, Flanders, Germany, and Italy, including the Old Dutch poem known as Hebban olla vogala.

== History ==
Bodley 340 and 342 may have been copied at St Augustine's Abbey, Canterbury in the early 11th century, but they were present at St Andrew's Cathedral Priory, Rochester from the mid-11th century on, when several Rochester-specific additions were made. There, they are also recorded in book lists from 1124, in the Textus Roffensis, and 1202. Their later history remains unknown until 1602, when they were given to the Bodleian Library as part of a donation by the member of parliament and administrator Sir Walter Cope.

The two volumes were long kept together and numbered consecutively. When they were renamed Bodley 340 and Bodley 342 in 1761, they were separated by Bodley 341, an unrelated 14th-century Latin manuscript.

== Contents ==
=== Old English homilies ===
The manuscripts were produced as two volumes of a collection of Old English homilies. Most of these come from the late 10th-century Catholic Homilies by the monk and scholar Ælfric of Eynsham. To these were added 11 anonymous homilies, including 5 texts that also appear among the late 10th-century Vercelli homilies. While Ælfric originally divided his Catholic Homilies into two series, the manuscripts follow a different order, rearranged in accordance with the church year. Additionally, some of Ælfric's homilies that are considered a single text by modern editors are divided into two separate parts in the manuscripts. Initially, the first volume, Bodley 340, thus contained 32 separate items, while the second volume, Bodley 342, contained 42.

=== Rochester additions ===
Bodley 342 was enlarged in Rochester in the mid-11th century. Several leaves were added to the back of the manuscript (folios 203–18). These leaves already contained incomplete texts of two homilies by Ælfric already present in Bodley 340, but they mainly provided additional space, on which was copied Ælfric's homily on Saint Andrew, the patron saint of Rochester, again divided into two separate parts. A Rochester scribe also used the empty space on fol. 202v to add a short text on Paulinus of York, whose relics were venerated at Rochester, noting that he wearð þa her bebyrged ("was then buried here"). The Rochester additions are written in a Kentish dialect distinguishing them from the original homilies’ standard Late West Saxon.

The homilies show evidence of having been read out loud in Rochester, where the Old English was not only extensively corrected but also annotated to help with pronunciation. They continued to be read in following centuries, with several leaves showing glosses in Latin and English from the 14th and 16th centuries.

== Pen trials ==
The manuscripts have attracted significant attention due to pen trials and annotations by non-English scribes, which are found mostly on empty spaces on leaves at the back of both volumes (Bodley 340, fol. 169v; Bodley 342, fol. 218v). Most of these can be dated to the period immediately following 1083, when the new Norman bishop Gundulf replaced Rochester's five remaining English canons with more than sixty monks from Norman monasteries.

=== Hebban olla vogala ===
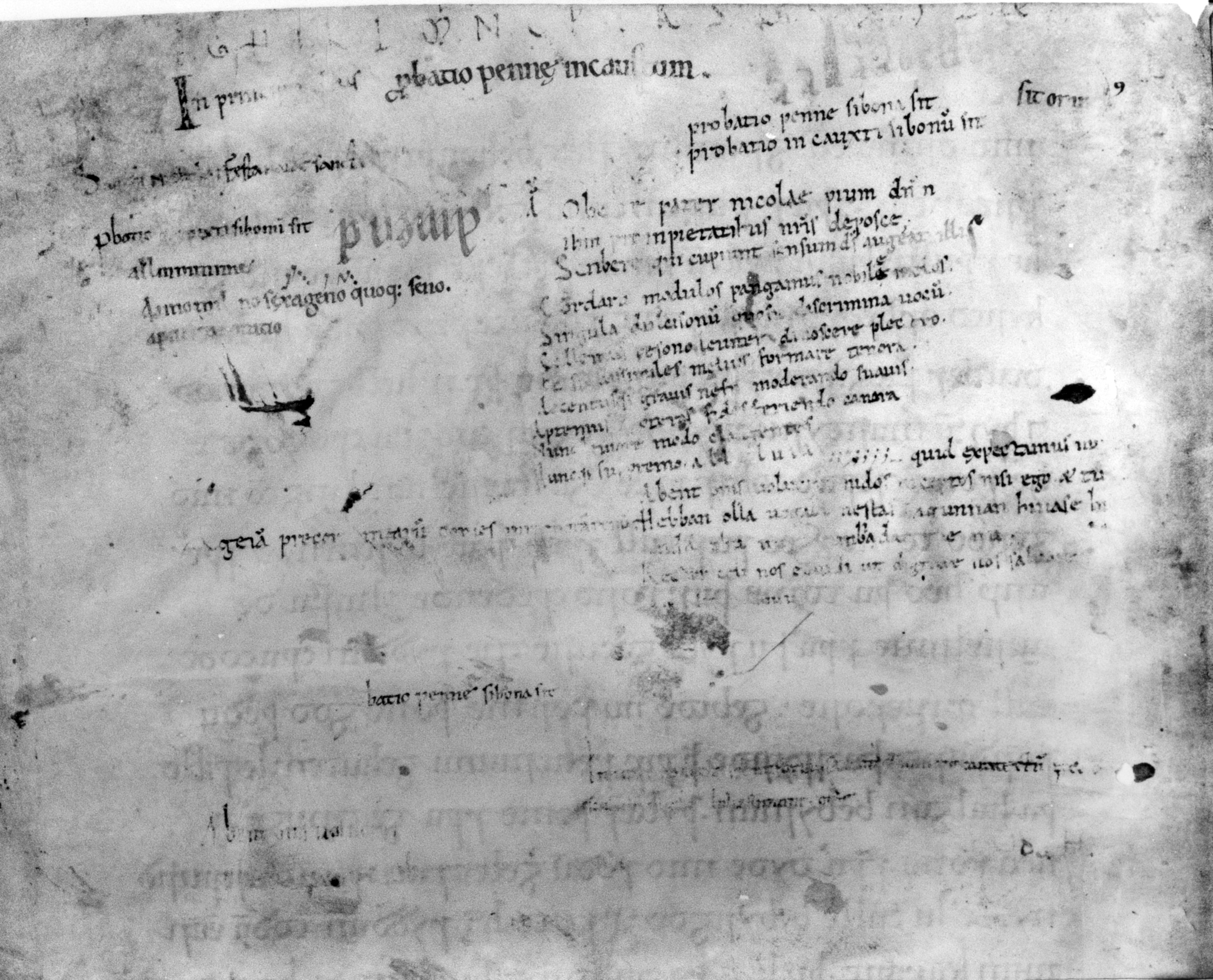
The pen trials in Bodley 340, fol. 169v

Bodley 340 famously contains the lyric known as Hebban olla vogala, which was long thought to be the oldest surviving text of Old Dutch following its discovery by Kenneth Sisam in 1932. It was copied out halfway down the page on fol. 169v among a number of Latin verses and a Latin prayer to Saint Nicholas, all written by a scribe trained in the Low Countries.

The poem reads Hebban olla uogala nestas hagunnan hinase hic enda thu uuat unbidan uue nu ("All birds have begun their nests, except me and you – what are we waiting for now?"), above which was then added its Latin translation: Abent omnes uolucres nidos inceptos nisi ego et tu quid expectamus nunc. Despite the scribe's origins, the language of the Dutch poem has been shown to display significant English influence; it is consequently best described as a linguistic blend, or even as an attempt at writing in English on the part of a Flemish-speaking scribe.

=== Other Continental scribes ===
In the later 11th and 12th centuries, pen trials in Latin were also added by two scribes trained in Germany and one trained in Italy. The fact that their characteristic style of writing appears in no other surviving manuscripts copied at Rochester has led Erik Kwakkel to suggest they may have switched to a more standardized Rochester script when copying books, only revealing their original handwriting in these casual pen trials.
