= Zeelandic =

Low Franconian dialect of Dutch

- Zeêuws
- Native to: Zeeland (Netherlands)
- Native speakers: (undated figure of 220,000)
- Language family: Indo-European: Germanic; West Germanic; Istvaeonic; Low Franconian; Dutch; West Flemish; Zeelandic
- Early forms: Frankish: Old Dutch; Middle Dutch; Modern Dutch
- Writing system: Zeelandic alphabet (Latin)

Language codes
- ISO 639-3: zea
- Glottolog: zeeu1238
- Linguasphere: 52-ACB-af
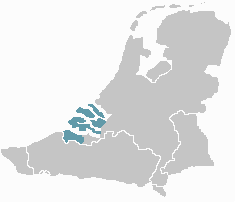
- Distribution of Zeelandic (blue) within the Dutch language area (grey)

Zeelandic (Zeeuws: Zeêuws; Dutch: Zeeuws [zeːu̯s]; West Flemish: Zêeuws) is a group of language varieties spoken in the southwestern parts of the Netherlands. It is currently considered a Low Franconian dialect of Dutch, but there have been movements to promote the status of Zeelandic from a dialect of Dutch to a separate regional language, which have been denied by the Dutch Ministry of Internal Affairs. More specifically, it is spoken in the southernmost part of South Holland (Goeree-Overflakkee) and large parts of the province of Zeeland, with the notable exception of eastern Zeelandic Flanders.

It has notable differences from Standard Dutch mainly in pronunciation but also in grammar and vocabulary, which separates it clearly from Standard Dutch. This makes mutual intelligibility with speakers of Standard Dutch difficult.

== Origin ==
In the Middle Ages and the early modern period, Zeeland was claimed by the Count of Holland as well as the Count of Flanders, and the area was exposed to influence from both directions. The dialects clearly show a gradual increase of Hollandic elements as one goes northwards. However, Zeelandic is fairly coherent with clear borders, as the broad sea arms form strong isoglosses.

The name Zeeuws is an old Zeelandic word that has been attested since the Middle Ages. An early citation by Jacob van Maerlant in his description of Sint-Francis goes as follows:

Men moet om de rime te souken
Misselike tonghe in bouken:
Duuts, Diets, Brabants, Vlaemsch, Zeeus;
Walsch, Latijn, Griex ende Hebreeus
One needs, to search for the rhymes
Various tongues in books:
German, Dutch, Brabantine, Flemish, Zeelandic;
Walloon, Latin, Greek and Hebrew

The name Zeeuws has been in use for the language spoken in Zeeland ever since, but in addition to this there are various other names. Speakers often refer to their dialect with the name of their own area, such as Walchers for Walcheren or Plat Axels for Zeelandic-Flanders (named after the town of Axel, but also used in other towns in this region to distinguish it from the West-Zeelandic-Flemish dialects spoken in the region surrounding Breskens), or sometimes with the name of their own village, such as Wasschappels for Westkapelle. This practice stems from the idea that each village has their own dialect, which is markedly different even from the dialect in the adjacent village, and that there is no such thing as one homogenous Zeelandic dialect or language. There is a large amount of resistance specifically in Goeree-Overflakkee against calling the local dialect Zeelandic, due to historical animosity between this region which belongs to South Holland, and Zeeland proper. In the past, Zeelandic was also called boers (farmer-like), in contrast to Standard Dutch which was known as op z'n burgers (like civilians, like the bourgeoisie), but this nomenclature has fallen out of fashion in recent times. The word plat, which is also used in other dialects to refer to any non-Standard-Dutch dialect, is also frequently used in Zeeland.

== Geographic spread and dialect continuum ==
Zeelandic is spoken in most areas in Zeeland province, excluding East-Zeelandic-Flanders where, traditionally, more East-Flemish dialects are spoken. North of Zeeland, Zeelandic is still spoken on the island of Goeree-Overflakkee. Traditionally, the Zeelandic language area also extended further north to the island Voorne-Putten, but the dialect has mostly disappeared from that area due to migration from urban areas such as Rotterdam.

In urban areas in Zeeland, the dialect is in decline due to migration from other areas in the Netherlands. In Vlissingen, Goes, Middelburg and, to a lesser extent, Terneuzen, Zeelandic dialect is being mostly replaced by Standard Dutch, although elderly people and people from surrounding rural areas can often still speak Zeelandic.

There are clear differences between Zeelandic and Hollandic, Brabantine and East-Flemish dialects, but there is more of a dialect continuum with West-Flemish language varieties. The dialects spoken more towards the western coastal region of Zeelandic-Flanders, locally referred to as Bressiaans, resemble the West-Flemish dialects spoken across the border more than the dialects spoken around Terneuzen and Axel, which preserve more Zeelandic features while also exhibiting West-Flemish features. Although these similarities are greater than those between Zeelandic and Hollandic dialects, there are some minor dialectal influences in the dialects spoken in Voorne-Putten, Hoeksche Waard and Rotterdam. There is hardly any dialectal influence from Zeelandic in the neighbouring Brabantine dialects, however, with the exception of the neighbouring villages of Oud-Vossemeer in Tholen and Nieuw-Vossemeer in North-Brabant.

== Characteristics ==
Zeelandic still has three grammatical genders and the final schwa of feminine words. It has kept the monophthongs [i] and [y] for ij and ui, rather than breaking them into [ɛi] and [œy]. It usually umlauts [aː] into [ɛː] and renders the old Germanic [ai] and [au] as falling diphthongs ([ɪə ~ ɪɐ ~ iɐ] and [ʊə ~ ʊɐ ~ uɐ], respectively, with the exact realisation depending on the dialect. Standard Dutch has merged them with etymological [eː] and [oː]. Finally, Zeelandic drops [h].

This table illustrates the differences (the orthography is Dutch):

Zeelandic	Dutch	English
d'n boer	de boer	the (male) farmer
de boerinne	de boerin	the (female) farmer
uus	huis	house
kieke(n)	kijken	to look
tweê	twee	two
oôd	hoofd	head
luust'ren	luisteren	to listen
jie	jij	you
piele	eend	duck

== Dialects ==
The province of Zeeland consists of several former islands that were difficult to reach until well into the 20th century. As a result, there is roughly one dialect per island. The respective dialects differ clearly but only slightly. The Goeree-Overflakkee dialect, for example, does not drop the h, and the Walcheren and Zuid-Beveland dialects have umlauted words, unlike the northern dialects (for example: beuter [bøtər] as opposed to boter [botər]. Within the island dialects themselves, dialectal differences also exist, and native speakers can frequently tell the village (at least on their own island) a person is from by the specific dialect that is spoken, even if the differences are inaudible to outsiders. For example, within the Tholen dialect, speakers from Poortvliet, a village roughly on the middle of the island, can use widely different words for something than speakers from Sint-Maartensdijk do, which lies only 5 km to the west of Poortvliet.

== Geographic distribution and social aspects ==
Zeelandic is strongly associated with the rural population, as it is spoken mainly in the countryside. The town dialects of Middelburg and Vlissingen are both much closer to Hollandic than the rural variants and are almost extinct. Surveys held in the 1990s found that at least 60% of Zeeland's population still use Zeelandic as their everyday language. An estimated 250,000 people speak Zeelandic as a mother tongue (West Zeelandic Flemish is included in that count), and although it is in decline, just as other regional languages, it is in no direct danger of extinction since in some villages with strong isolated communities, more than 90% of the youngsters still speak Zeelandic. On the other hand, in several villages with much immigration, the local dialect is spoken only by adults, as children are no longer taught it. A lobby for recognising the Zeelandic regional language under the European Charter for Minority Languages was, as of 2005, unable to achieve that status.

== Gallery ==
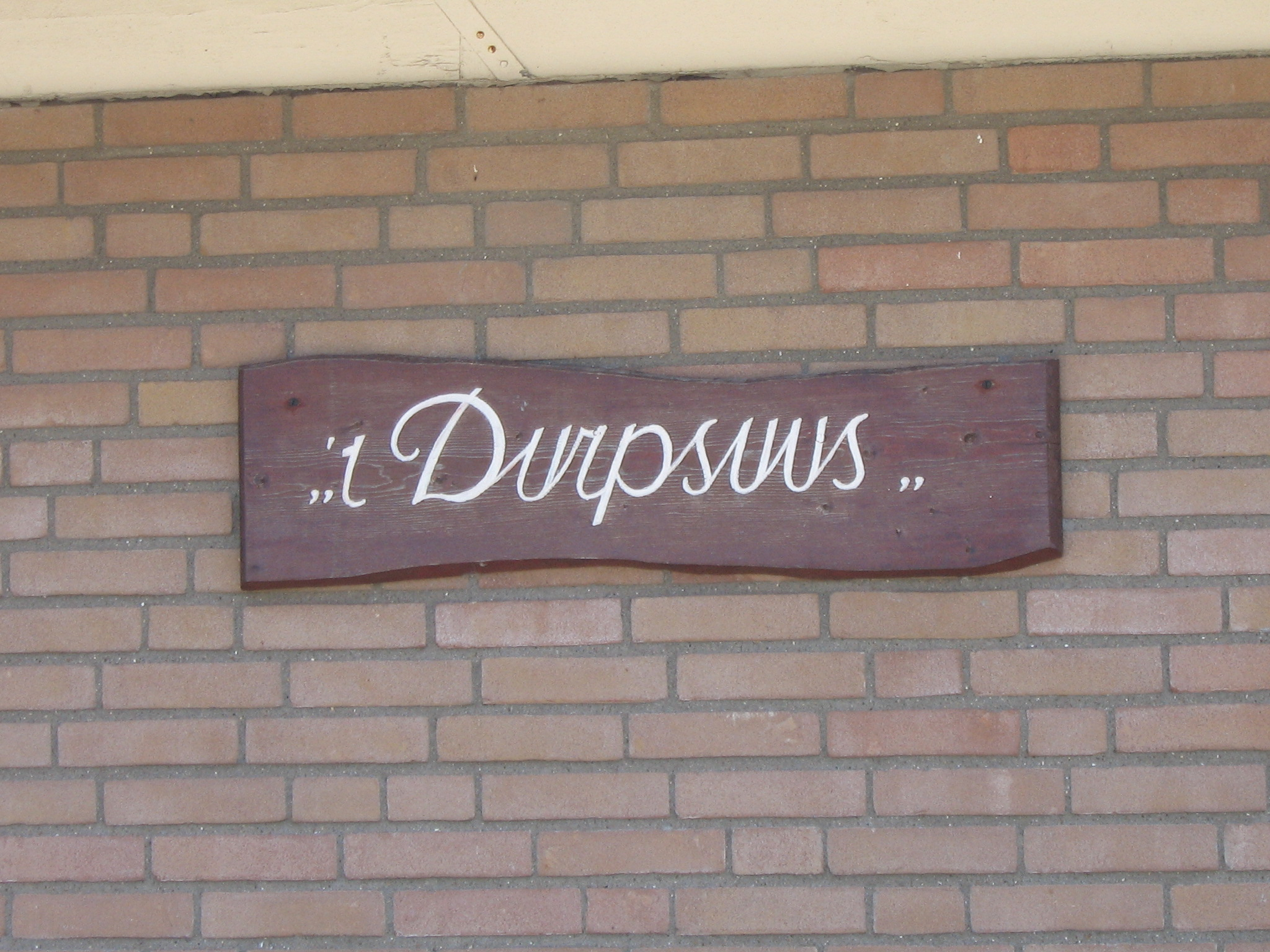
Zeelandic sign in Driewege, "Durpsuus", which is Zeelandic for a community centre

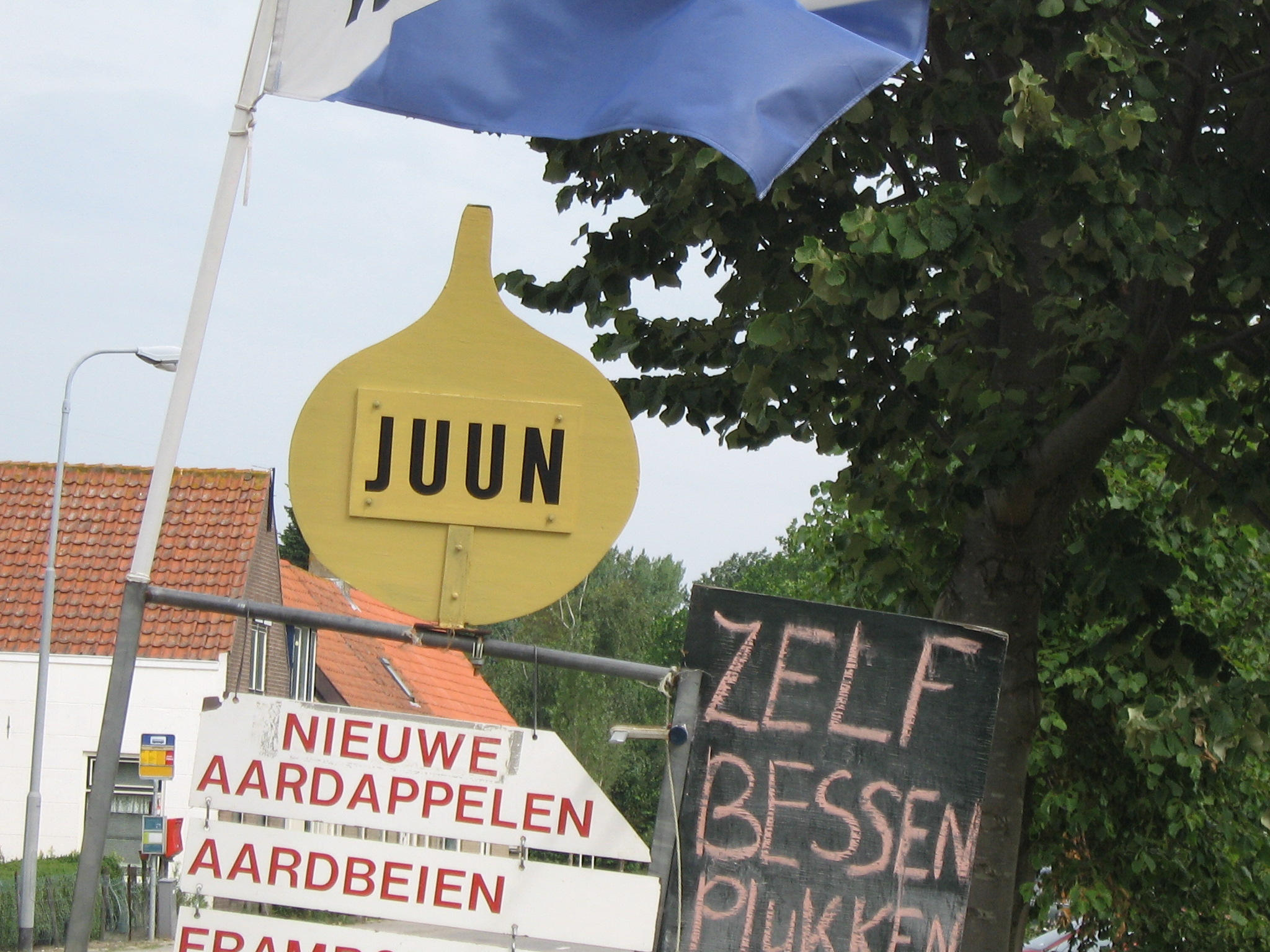
"Juun", Zeelandic for onion

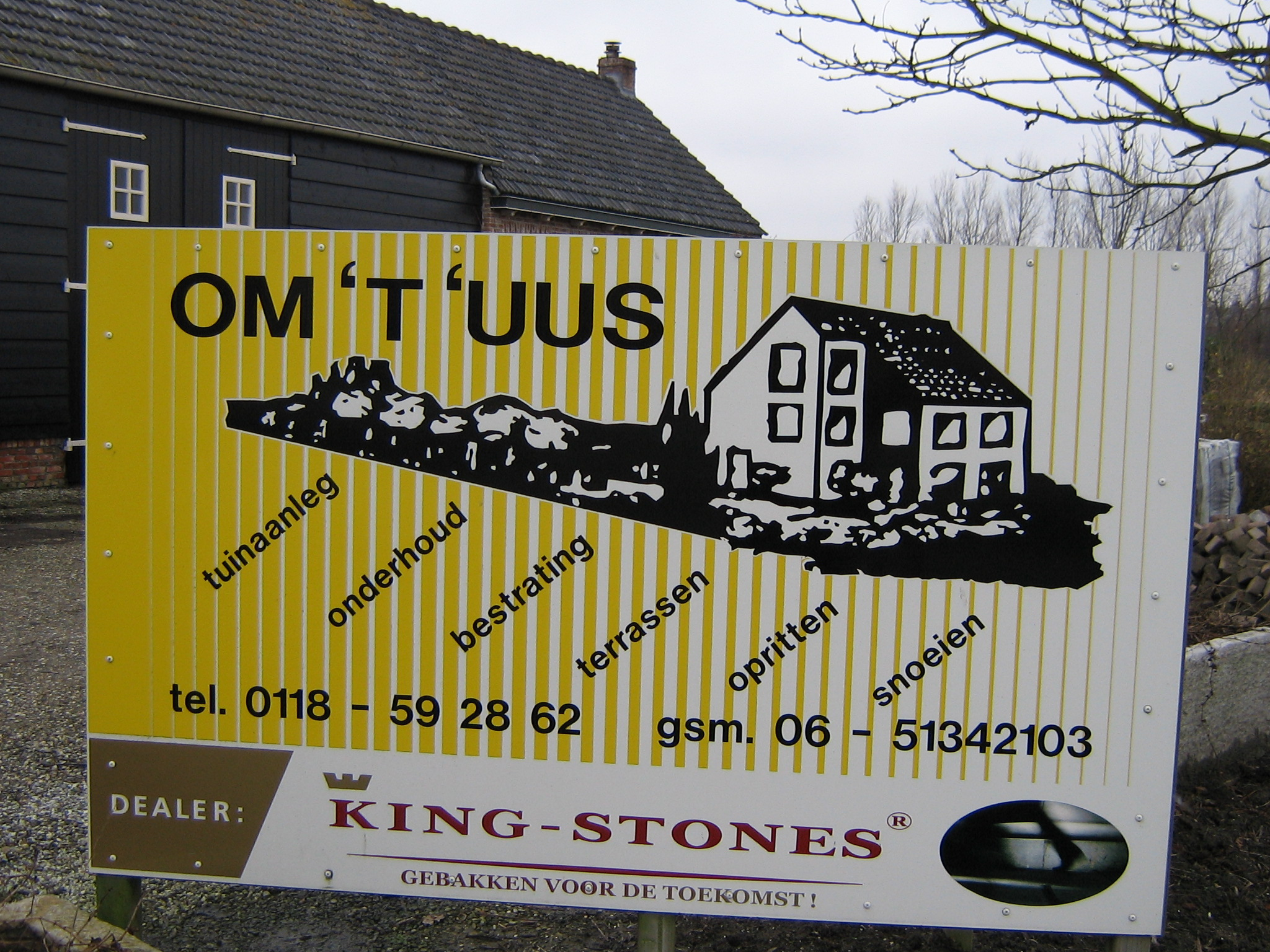
Company bearing a Zeelandic name
