= Law of Wihtred =

- Ascribed to: Wihtred, King of Kent
- Language: Old English
- Date: c. 695
- Principal manuscript(s): Textus Roffensis
- First printed edition: George Hickes and Humfrey Wanley, Linguarum Vett. Septentrionalium Thesaurus Grammatico-Criticus et Archaeologicus (Oxford, 1703–5); see Law of Æthelberht#Manuscript, editions and translations
- Genre: law code

The Law of Wihtred is an early English legal text attributed to the Kentish king Wihtred (died 725). It is believed to date to the final decade of the 7th century and is the last of three Kentish legal texts, following the Law of Æthelberht and the Law of Hlothhere and Eadric. It is devoted primarily to offences within and against the church, as well as church rights and theft.

== Provenance ==
The prologue of the text and the red manuscript rubric attribute the law to Wihtred (died 725), king of Kent. Wihtred reigned from around or just after 690 to 725, and the text suggests he issued the law's provisions in 695.

Like the other Kentish codes, the Law of Wihtred survives in only one manuscript, known as the "Rochester Codex" or Textus Roffensis. This is a compilation of Anglo-Saxon historic and legal material drawn together in the early 1120s under the supervision of Ernulf, bishop of Rochester. Wihtred's law occupies folios 5^{v} to 6^{v}.

== Issue ==
The prologue itself states that the "great men" of Kent issued the provisions before a large assembly of Kentish people, while Wihtred was "ruling in the fifth winter of his reign, in the ninth indiction, sixth day of Rugern [rye-harvest]" at "that place which is called Berghamstead" It is the only Kentish code to provide a regnal date, one working out to 6 September 695.

The prologue relates that Brihtwald, "archbishop of Britain" (Bretone heahbiscop, i.e., archbishop of Canterbury) was present, along with Gebmund, bishop of Rochester. This is appropriate as, unlike the two earlier Kentish codes, Wihtred's law is concerned with the church and religious matters. Similar to Ine's Law on several points, both laws may have drawn on Latin ecclesiastical canons.

== Content ==
Recent editor of the text Lisi Oliver broke the provisions down as follows:

Provisions	Description
Prologue	Background and people behind the rulings
1–2	Rights of the Church
3–4	Provisions against sinful matrimony
5–6	Provisions against abusive ecclesiastics
7	Manumission (i.e., freeing of slaves)
8–11	Punishments for breaking church law
12–16	Exculpation (i.e., clearing oneself with an oath)
17–19	Church's right of exculpation
20–22	Punishment for theft

The chapter divisions are editorial and although divided into 22 chapters by Oliver, an earlier editor Frederick Attenborough had divided it into 28 separate chapters.

The Law allows that a bishop's word, like a king's, is to be regarded as legally incontrovertible without needing any concomitant oath, though lesser ecclesiastics must exculpate themselves before the altar. Provision 1 exempted the church of paying taxes to the king, but it also specified that churchmen must pray for and honour the king.

A charter of Wihtred's, dating c. 699, has an almost identical provision, exempting the kingdom's minsters from tax, but in turn requiring the king's position be respected otherwise. Some of the clauses regarding illicit marriages and the authority of bishops echo rulings made by the 672 Synod of Hertford, presided over by Theodore of Tarsus.

Included among the other religious offences punished are the consumption of meat during Christian fasting and gift-giving to pagan idols. The law also punishes nobles for working their slaves on the Sabbath, and frees such slaves if they are so forced. Working on the Sabbath was a concern also addressed in the near-contemporary Paenitentiale Theodori, attributed to Archbishop Theodore.

The theft provisions of the code allow the killing of thieves caught in the act, without the need to pay wergild. If the thief is not killed, the capturer is entitled to half the payment if the thief is subsequently ransomed, though the king may himself kill the thief or have him enslaved "across the sea" in addition to ransoming for the value of the thief's wergild. The law's final chapter provides that any foreigner or stranger who goes off the track and does not draw attention to himself by blowing his horn may be killed or captured.
