= Hebban olla vogala =

11th-century Old Dutch text fragment

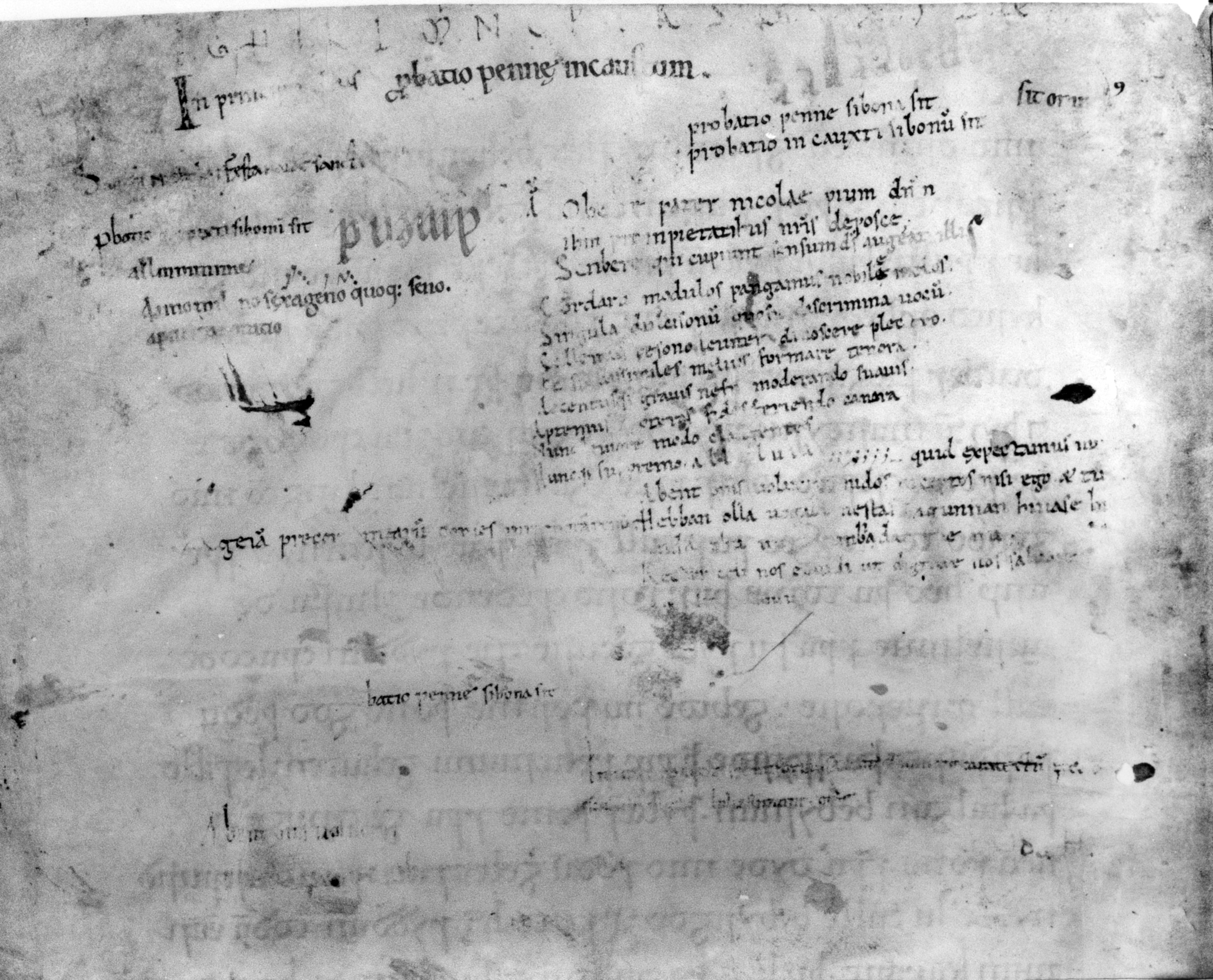
Usual reading of text (middle right): quid expectamus nunc. Abent omnes uolucres nidos inceptos nisi ego et tu. Hebban olla uogala nestas hagunnan hinase hic enda thu uuat unbidan uue nu. Rector celi nos exaudi ut dignare nos saluare.

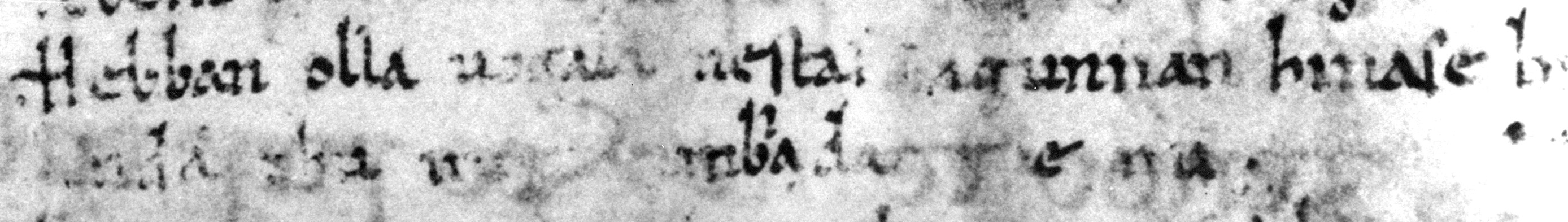
Fragment from text.

"Hebban olla vogala", sometimes spelled "hebban olla uogala", are the first three words of an 11th-century text fragment written in Old Dutch. The fragment was discovered in 1932 on the back of the end-leaf of a manuscript that once belonged to the cathedral priory of Rochester, Kent, now Oxford, Bodleian Library, MS Bodley 340. The manuscript contains a collection of Old English sermons by Ælfric of Eynsham. The Dutch text is found on fol. 169v and probably dates to the late 11th century. It was long considered to represent a West Flemish variant of Old Low Franconian, although more recent research shows that it also displays significant influence from Old English.

An often-cited poem, it was long believed by many Dutch-speakers to be the only remaining text in Old Dutch. However, experts were already aware of other sources that were then not yet easily accessible. Today, more than 42,000 Old Dutch words and phrases from sources such as the Wachtendonck Psalms and the Leiden Willeram have been discovered, with the oldest definitive source being the Salian Law.

== Text ==
The complete text, a probatio pennae or "scribble" by the writer to test his pen, is usually transcribed as Hebban olla uogala nestas hagunnan hinase hic enda thu uuat unbidan uue nu, although the manuscript text is very faded and many scholars differ slightly in their reading of the poem. A word-for-word translation into Latin was written directly above it: (H)abent omnes uolucres nidos inceptos nisi ego et tu quid expectamus nu(nc). It is roughly translated as: "All birds have begun nests, except me and you – what are we waiting for now?"

== Origin ==
The text was long considered West Flemish; the arguments in favour of this view were advanced by Moritz Schönfeld in 1933. According to his interpretation, *agunnan, hinase and (as he read it) anda are Ingvaeonic forms whose presence might be expected in any of the coastal dialects of Old Frisian, Old Saxon or Old Frankish. However, the -n of third person plural hebban, which is absent in both Old English and Frisian, identifies the language as Old Dutch. (Old High German habent uses a different stem.) Schönfeld identified nestas as the plural of a masculine nest that is attested in Middle Dutch and is still present in West Flemish, and he noted that vogala has an epenthetic vocal of a type also found in certain Old Ghentish words, whereas Old English has fuglas. The form olla is the result of a vowel shift a > o before ll that is thought to have occurred in West Flemish at a very early date, possibly before 900.

The debate regarding the text's language, however, was reopened in 2004, when Luc De Grauwe asserted that many of the text's forms could also reflect the Kentish dialect of Old English. It has particularly been pointed out that the -s plural of nestas, the verb aginnan and the ending on -e of hinase are in fact more typical of Old English. The emerging consensus view is that the text is a linguistic blend of Old Dutch and Old English; it may even reflect a Flemish-speaking scribe's attempt at writing in English, making it not only a probatio pennae, or pen trial, but also a "probatio linguae", or language trial.

== Language comparisons ==
Kenny Louwen gives a comparison of different forms the sentence would be expected to take in Old Dutch, Old English and Middle Dutch, which highlights the linguistic influences the text as it survives in the manuscript. (He reads umbidan rather than unbidan.)

Manuscript text	Hebban	olla	uogala	nestas	hagunnan	hinase	hic	enda	thu	uuat	umbidan	uue	nu
Old Dutch	Hebban(t)	alla	uogala	nest(a)	bigunnan	hit ne sē	(h)ic	enda	thu	uuat	umbidan(t)	uue	nu
Old English	Habbað	ealle	fuglas	nestas	agunnen	hit ne sē	(h)ic	and	þu	hwæt	onbīdað	we	nu
Middle Dutch	Hebben	olle	uogele	neste	begonnen	hit en sē	(h)ic	ende	du	wat	ombiden	we	nu

The form hinase is a contracton of hit ne sī ("[if] it were not") used as a preposition ("except"); it corresponds morphologically to Modern Dutch tenzij ("unless"), which however is a conjunction. Below is a comparison of the manuscript text with the closest cognate of each word in modern Dutch and English.

Manuscript text	Hebban	olla	uogala	nestas	hagunnan	hinase	hic	enda	thu	uuat	umbidan	uue	nu
Dutch	Hebben	alle	vogels	nesten	begonnen	tenzij	ik	en	(u/jij)	wat	beiden	we	nu
English	Have	all	fowls	nests	begun	(except)	I	and	thou	what	bide	we	now

A colloquial translation in Modern Dutch would read: Alle vogels zijn nesten begonnen, behalve ik en jij – waarop wachten we nu?

== Various theories ==
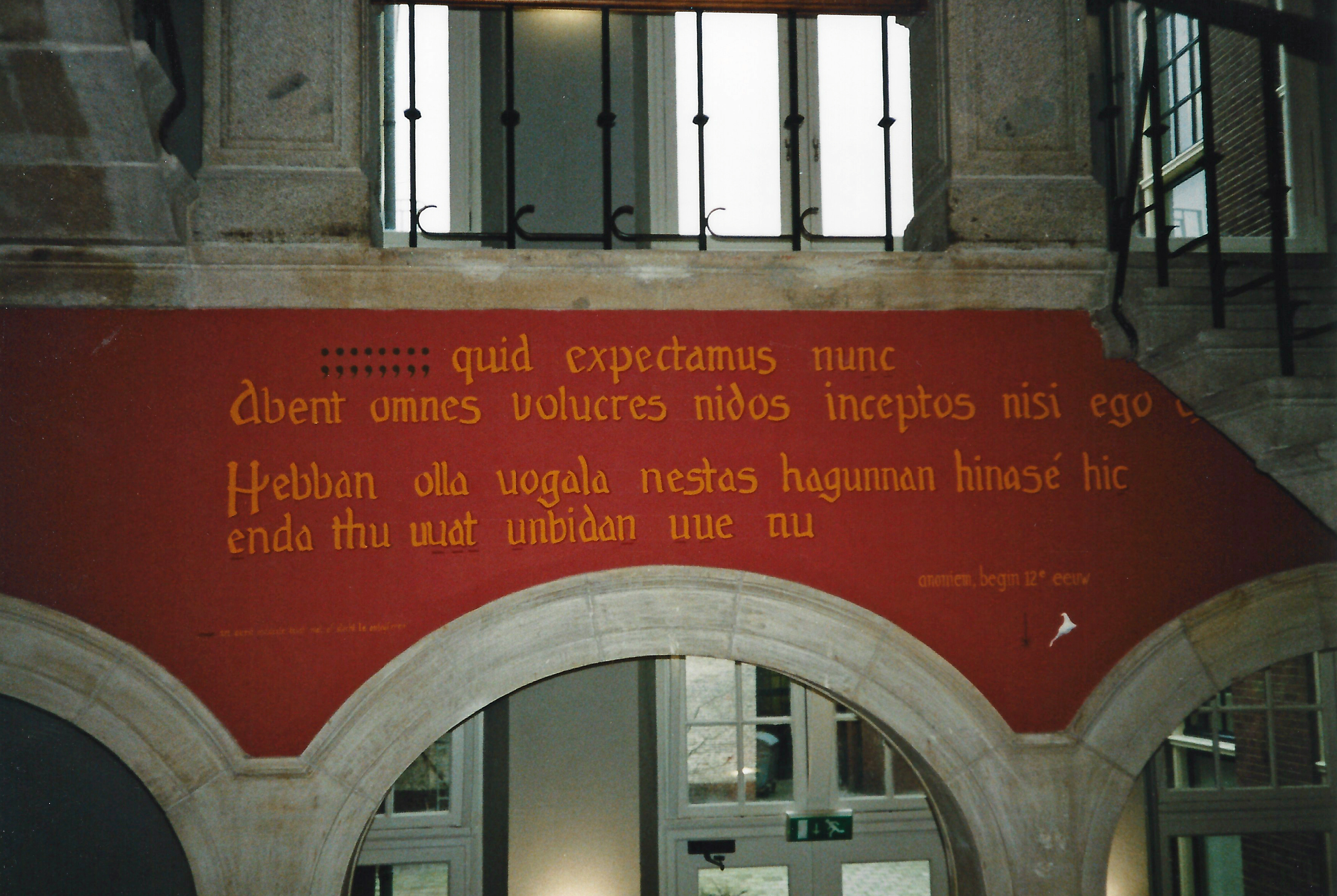
Wall poem in Leiden

Frits van Oostrom has linked it to the Moorish Kharjas genre, which includes verses sung by women to their absent lovers. He concludes that the fragment was probably written by a woman or from a female perspective.

== See also ==
- Gruuthuse manuscript
- History of Dutch
