= Kentish Old English =

Dialect of Old English

- Native to: England
- Region: Parts of South East England
- Ethnicity: Anglo-Saxons
- Language family: Indo-European: Germanic; West Germanic; North Sea Germanic; Anglo-Frisian; Anglic; Kentish Old English
- Early forms: Proto-Indo-European: Proto-Germanic

Language codes
- ISO 639-3: –

Kentish was a southern dialect of Old English spoken in the Anglo-Saxon kingdom of Kent. It was one of four dialect-groups of Old English, the other three being Mercian, Northumbrian (known collectively as the Anglian dialects), and West Saxon.

== Geographical distribution ==
The dialect was spoken in what are now the modern-day Counties of Kent, Surrey, Sussex, southern Hampshire and the Isle of Wight by the Germanic settlers, identified by Bede as Jutes. Such a distinct difference in the Anglo-Saxon settlers of the entire Kingdom of Kent is viewed more sceptically by modern historians.

== Documentation ==
The principal evidence for Kentish are the Old Kentish Glosses. Henry Sweet included two Kentish charters and a Kentish Psalm (from the Vespasian Psalter) in his Anglo-Saxon Reader; a charter of Oswulf (805-10) and a charter of Abba (835). Although by far the most important surviving Kentish manuscripts are the law codes of the Kentish kings, contained in Textus Roffensis, they were early-twelfth-century copies of much earlier laws, and their spellings and forms of English were modernised and standardised in various ways. This particularly affects the Laws of Hlothhere and Eadric. However, some indications of the differences between late-seventh-century Kentish and West Saxon can be made by comparing two contemporaneous laws. The law code of the West-Saxon king Ine was composed at some point between 688 and 694. Clause 20 concerns potential thefts by outsiders (i.e. those not owing allegiance to the kings of Wessex). This was adopted almost word for word by Ine's contemporary, the Kentish king Wihtræd:

West Saxon: Ine, 20	Kentish: Wihtræd, 23
Gif feorcund mon oððe fremde butan wege geond wudu gonge [ond] ne hrieme ne horn blawe, for ðeof he bið to profianne, oððe to sleanne oððe to aliesanne.	[23] Gif feorran[-]cumen man oþþe fræmde buton wege gange, [ond] he þonne nawðer ne hryme ne he horn ne blawe, for ðeof he bið to profianne, oþþe to sleanne oþþe to alysenne.
If a man who is come from afar or a stranger should go outside the track towards the woods and neither calls out or blows his horn, he is to be regarded as a thief, either to be killed or to be redeemed.	If a man [who is] come from afar or a stranger should go off the track and he then neither calls out nor does he blow his horn, he is to be regarded as a thief, either to be killed or to be redeemed.

== Classification ==
With many words at this point, there is no difference between Kentish and what became the dominant West-Saxon form of English. Other words indicate possible differences in pronunciation (or, at least, of transcribing), such as fremde/ fræmde or gonge/ gange. However, there is little doubt that, even with minor differences in syntax and vocabulary, the two forms were mutually intelligible, at least by this relatively late date in the Anglo-Saxon settlement of southern England.
