= Old Kentish Glosses =

The Old Kentish Glosses are a series of glosses written in the Kentish dialect of Old English on parts of the Latin text of the biblical Book of Proverbs. They are found in the first section of the manuscript London, British Library, Cotton Vespasian D.vi, which was copied in the tenth century in southern England (perhaps at Canterbury). These glosses are the main source for our knowledge today of Kentish Old English.

== Editions and facsimiles ==
- Ursula Kalbhen, Kentische Glossen und kentischer Dialekt im Altenglischen, mit einer kommentierten Edition der altenglischen Glossen in der Handschrift London, British Library, Cotton Vespasian D.vi, Münchener Universitätsschriften (Frankfurt/M.: Lang, 2003), ISBN 978-3-631-38392-6 [containing a detailed description of the manuscript and its texts as well as an edition of the Kentish glosses, with commentary and a study of Kentish Old English].
- Cotton MS Vespasian D VI, digitised at the British Library.
