= Oud-Vossemeer =

Village in Zeeland, Netherlands

Oud-Vossemeer Ou-Vossemaer
- Village
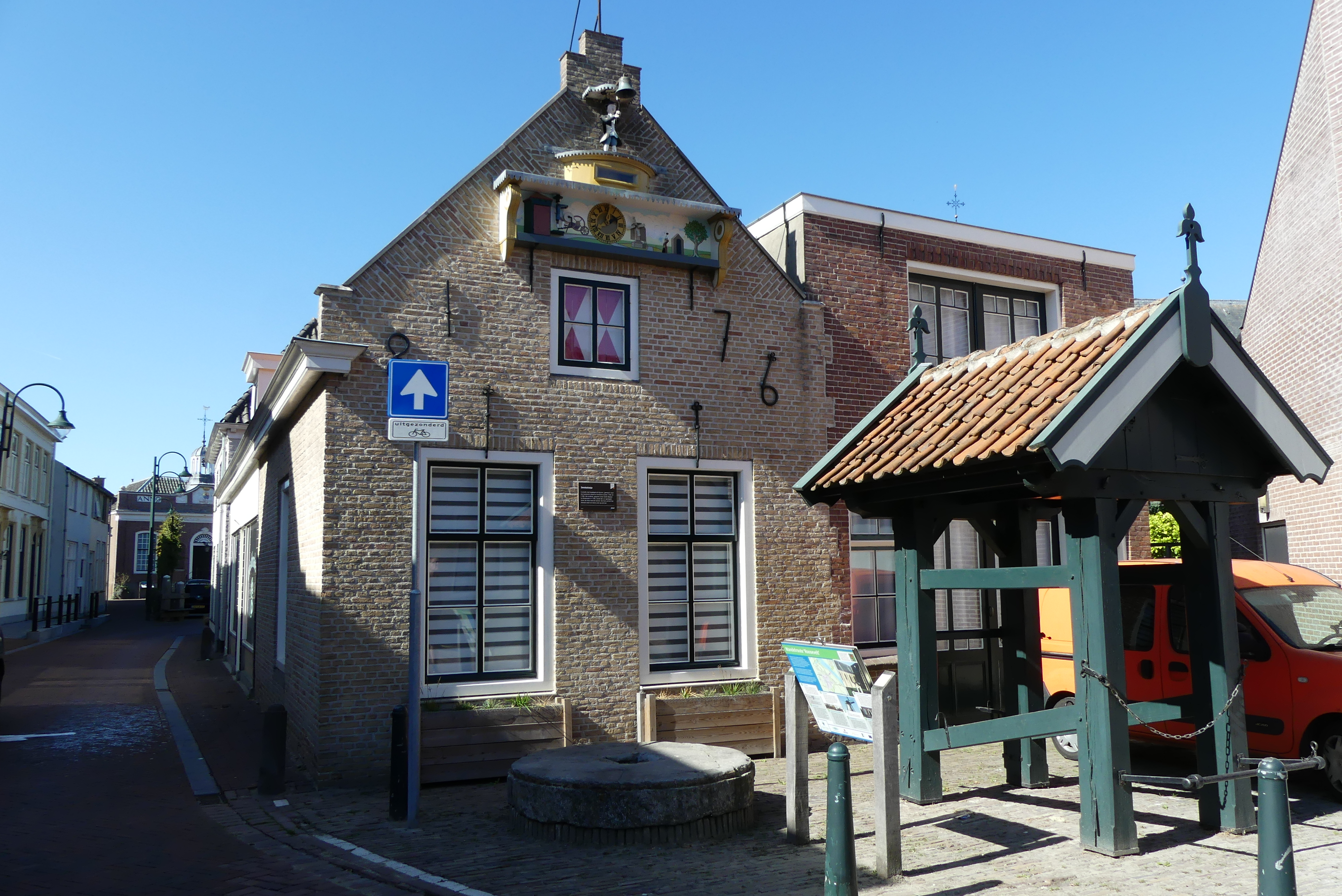
- The former forge of Oud-Vossemeer

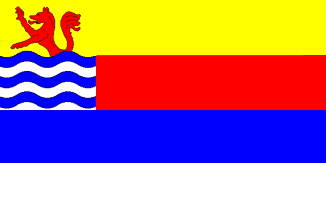
- Flag Coat of arms

- Location in the province of Zeeland in the Netherlands Oud-Vossemeer (Netherlands)
- Coordinates: 51°34′14″N 4°11′59″E
- Country: Netherlands
- Province: Zeeland
- Municipality: Tholen

Area
  - Total: 20.43 km^{2} (7.89 sq mi)
- Elevation: 0.4 m (1.3 ft)

Population (2021)
  - Total: 2,730
  - Density: 134/km^{2} (346/sq mi)
- Time zone: UTC+1 (CET)
  - Summer (DST): UTC+2 (CEST)
- Postal code: 4698
- Dialing code: 0166

Oud-Vossemeer (Zeelandic: Ou-Vossemaer) is a village on the island of Tholen in the Dutch province of Zeeland. It is a part of the municipality of Tholen, and lies about 13 km northwest of Bergen op Zoom, close to the Eendracht, part of the Scheldt-Rhine Canal.

== History ==
The village was first mentioned in 1410 as Vosmer, and means "old fresh water stream". Oud (old) has been added to distinguish from Nieuw-Vossemeer. Oud-Vossemeer is a circular church village which developed after the Kerkepolder was poldered in 1411. Up to the 16th century, it formed a heerlijkheid with Nieuw-Vossemeer. In 1576, it was burnt by the Dutch States Army.

The tower of the Dutch Reformed church dates from 1450. The church was heavily damaged by the 1576 fire. It was rebuilt in 1595, and the tower was placed inside the church. The church was extensively modified between 1913 and 1915. The Catholic St Willibrordus Church is an aisleless church with wooden tower from 1841. The interior was modified in 1928.

The former forge dates from 1786. The façade contains a "smith's clock" from c. 1805 with carved wooden figures, and has a wooden ringer with a brass bell. Above the clock is tunnel with cavalry figures. The clock was restored in 1960. Since 2015, the Roosevelt Information centre is housed in the forge.

Oud-Vossemeer was home to 1,364 people in 1840. It includes the previous municipality and hamlet of Vrijberge. In 1944, Oud-Vossemeer and the surrounding country side was inundated by the Germans. Oud-Vossemeer was a separate municipality until 1971, when it was merged with Tholen.

== Notable people ==
The ancestors of the American presidential family Roosevelt may have lived in Oud-Vossemeer. A monument honouring the Four Freedoms (formulated by Franklin Delano Roosevelt) was placed in the centre of the village.

== Gallery ==
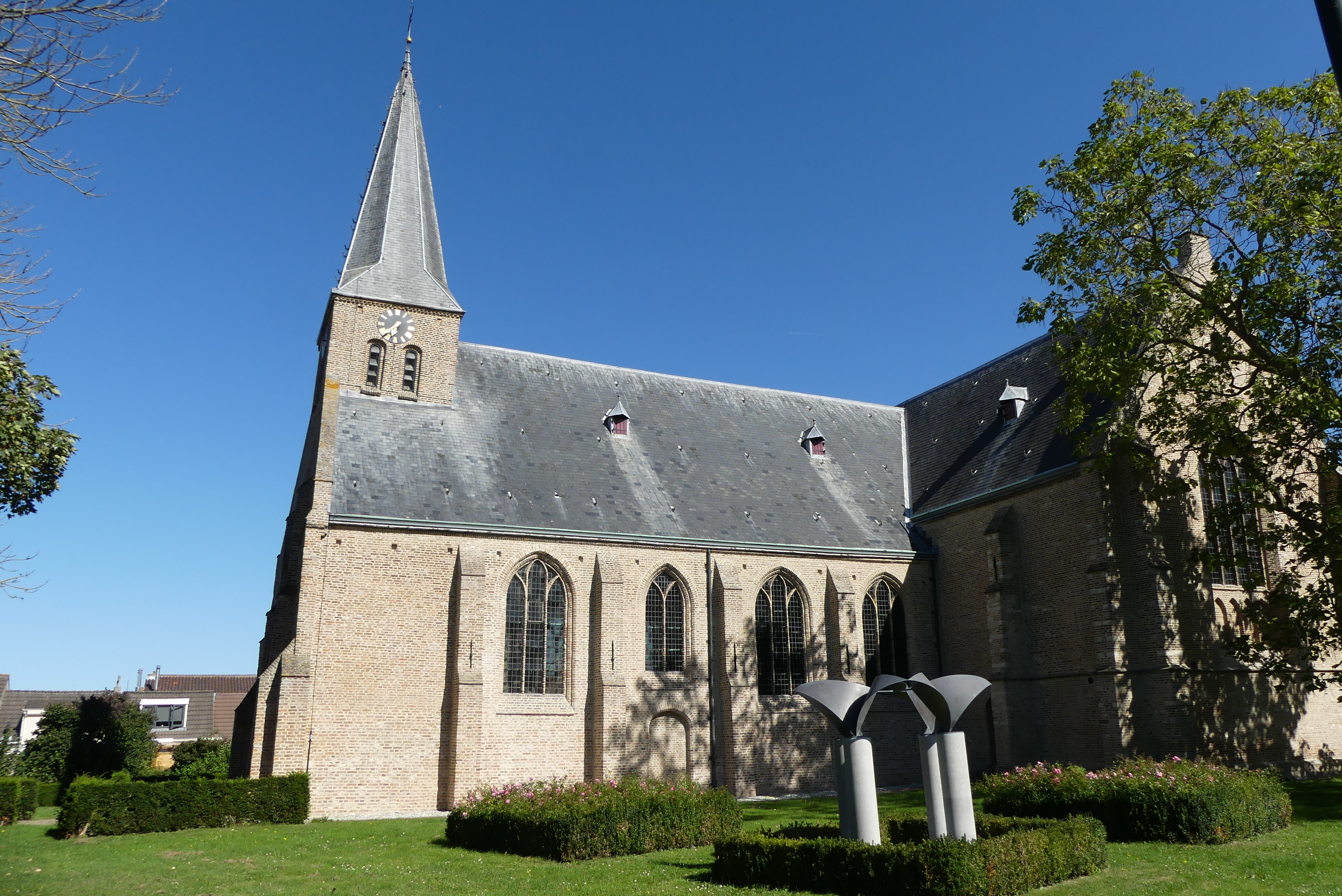
Dutch Reformed church

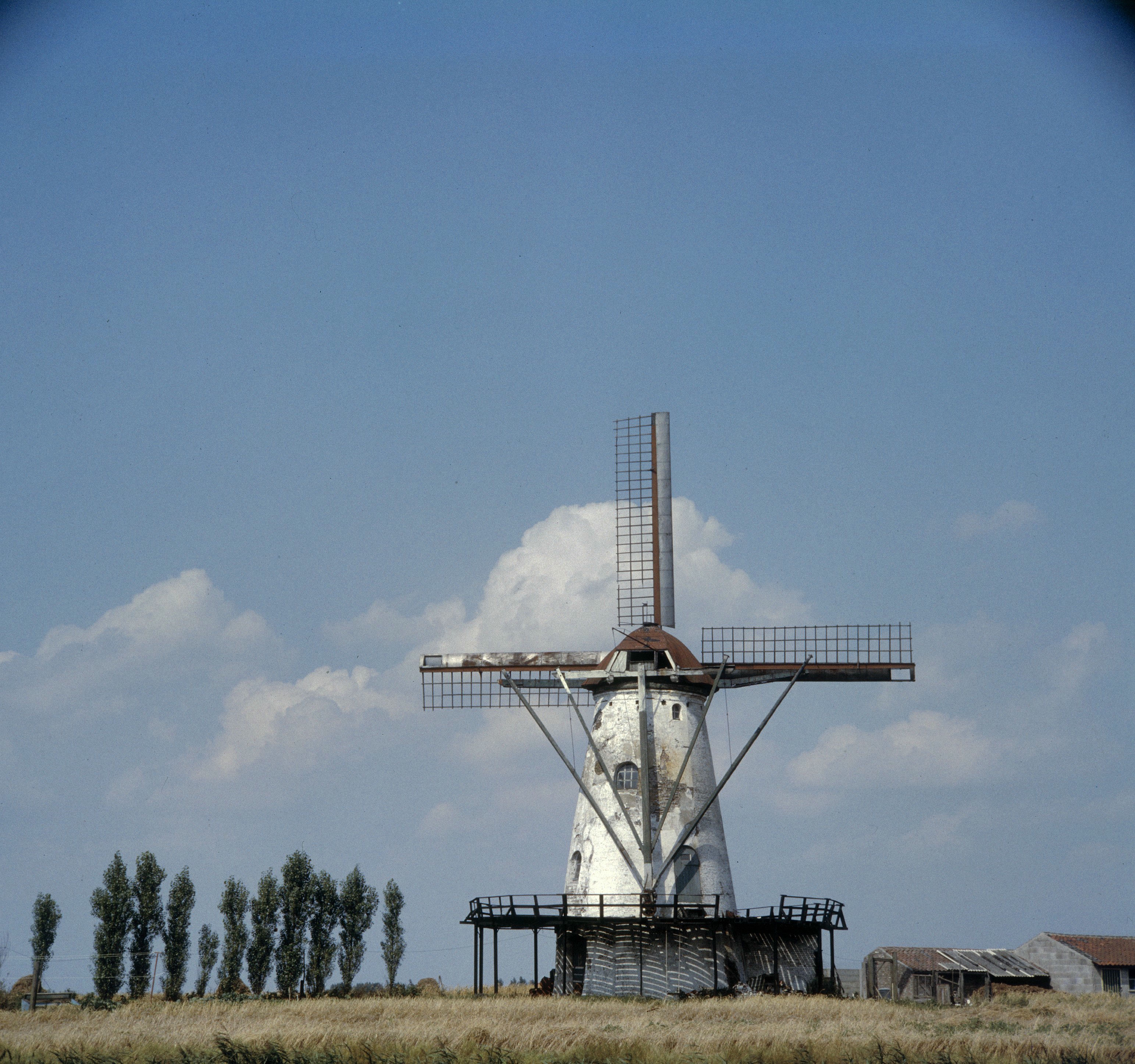
Wind mill De Jager

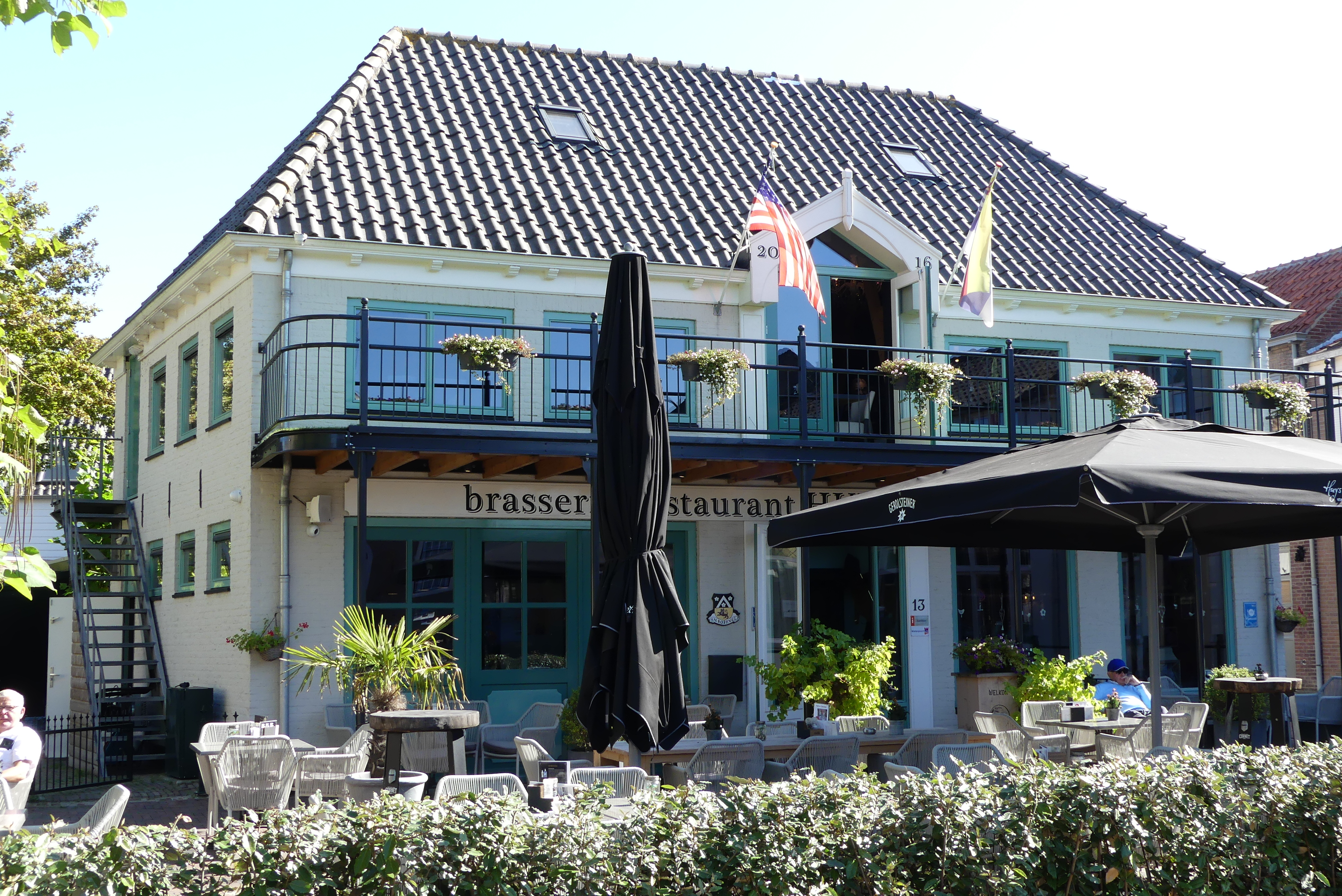
Restaurant Huys van Roosevelt

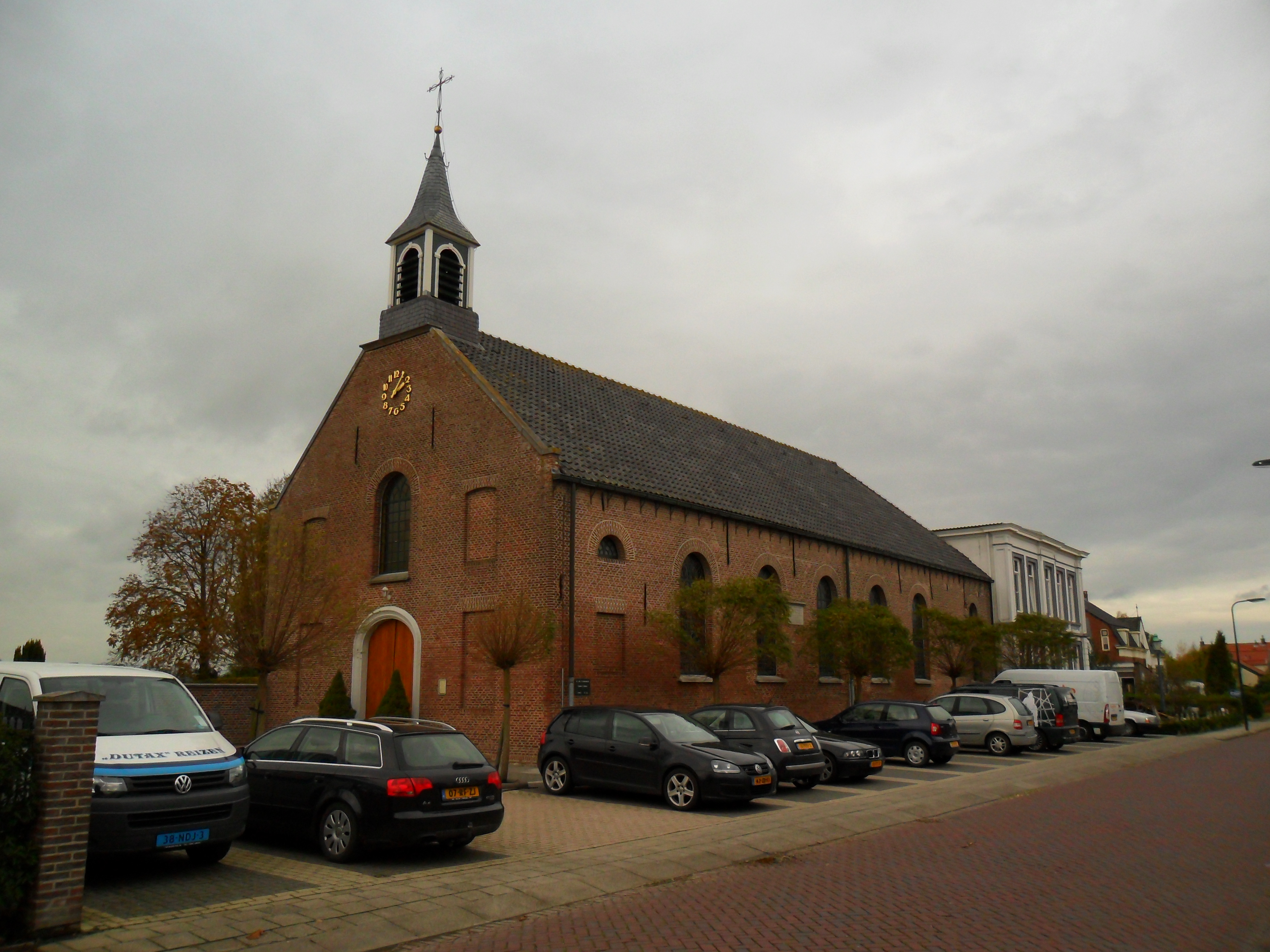
St Willibrordus Church
