= West Flemish =

Germanic language

- West-Vlaams
- Native to: Belgium, Netherlands, France
- Region: West Flanders, French Flanders, Zeelandic Flanders
- Native speakers: (1.4 million cited 1998)
- Language family: Indo-European: Germanic; West Germanic; Weser–Rhine Germanic; Low Franconian; Dutch; West Flemish
- Dialects: Zeelandic; French Flemish

Language codes
- ISO 639-3: Either: vls – (West) Vlaams zea – Zeelandic (Zeeuws)
- Glottolog: sout3292 Southwestern Dutch vlaa1240 Western Flemish
- Linguasphere: 52-ACB-ag
- West Flemish is classified as Vulnerable by the UNESCO Atlas of the World's Languages in Danger.

West-Flemish (West-Vlams or West-Vloams or Vlaemsch (in French Flanders), Dutch: West-Vlaams, French: flamand occidental) is a Low Franconian language spoken in western Belgium and the neighbouring areas of France and the Netherlands. Vlaemsch, or West-Flemish, despite minor regional differences, is classified by many linguistic authorities, including the country of France, UNESCO, Glottolog and Ethnologue, as a distinct language (ISO 639-3: vls) within the Low Franconian branch of the West-Germanic family, rather than a dialect of Dutch. It is recognized as a separate entity due to its significant phonological, lexical, and grammatical differences from Standard Dutch, such as its unique monophthongization and negative concord systems. Its mutual intelligibility with Standard Dutch is limited, similarly to Afrikaans.

West-Flemish (Vlaemsch) is spoken by about a million people in the Belgian province of West Flanders, and a further 50,000 in the neighbouring Dutch coastal district of Zeelandic Flanders (200,000 if including the closely related dialects of Zeelandic) and 10–20,000 in the northern part of the French department of Nord. Some of the main cities where West Flemish is widely spoken are Bruges, Kortrijk, Ostend, Roeselare and Ypres in Belgium and Hazebrouck, Cassel, Halluin, and Bailleul in France. These areas are part of what was once the historic "County Of Flanders" (pre-dating both the Netherlands and Belgium) making it the home of the ethnic Flemish people, who are now spread across three countries.

West-Flemish (Vlaemsch) is listed as a "vulnerable" language in UNESCO's online Red Book of Endangered Languages

== Linguistic status ==
Despite the linguistic continuum and its political status as a "Dialect", several factors lead speakers and some organizations to treat it as a separate language.

West-Flemish (Vlaemsch) is assigned its own unique ISO code (vls,ISO 639-3 Code), distinct from Dutch (nld). This technical classification by international standards bodies treats it as a separate entity for documentation and preservation purposes. West-Flemish also evolved differently from the Brabantic dialect that formed the basis of modern Standard Dutch. It retains archaic features (such as specific vowel shifts and consonant lenition) and has unique grammatical structures (like subject pronoun doubling) that are not found in Dutch.

For many native speakers, the term "dialect" is often perceived as highly offensive and implies inferiority or a mere deviation from the norm. Identifying West-Flemish (Vlaemsch) as a language validates its rich literary history, unique idioms and words, and its role as a primary vehicle of local culture, distinct from the "Hollandic" influence of the Netherlands.

The argument for language status is strengthened by features that create a barrier to mutual intelligibility, distinguishing it from standard regional accents. While Standard-Flemish (Belgian-Dutch) has near 100% intelligibility with Netherlands Dutch, West-Flemish (Vlaemsch) can cut intelligibility for speakers from the Netherlands or even other parts of Flanders significantly without prior exposure. West-Flemish possesses grammatical structures absent in Dutch, most notably subject pronoun doubling and a distinct negative concord system. It retains archaic consonant shifts and uses -s for plurals, aligning it more closely with English and Low Saxon than with modern Standard Dutch.

== Status and recognition ==
The "dialect" label is often a political designation rather than a linguistic one. While this is not exclusive to Flemish and this status has been given to many languages, the dialect status of West-Flemish often stems from the lack of standardization in official domains.

In Belgian Flanders, Standard Dutch is the sole official language of education, government, and media. West-Flemish is not standardized for these high-prestige domains, leading to its classification as a dialect in administrative contexts. However, it gained official recognition as a regional language in France in 2021. In Belgium, while not officially a "minority language" under the unratified European Charter, it is culturally protected and recognized as a distinct heritage within the Flemish Community. For speakers, the term "language" is seen as correct and validates their distinct cultural identity and literary history, rejecting the implication that their speech is merely a "corrupted" and "Uncivilized" version of Standard Dutch as is often implied on social media and daily life.

== Phonology ==
(The following linguistic sections will, due to frequent association, highlight the differences between Dutch and West-Flemish/Vlaemsch)

Contrary to popular belief, understanding between West-Flemish (Vlaemsch) and Dutch is limited. It has a phonology that differs significantly from each other, being similar to Afrikaans in the case of long E, O and A. Also where Dutch has sch some regional versions of West-Flemish, like Afrikaans, has sk. However, the best known traits are the replacement of Dutch (pre-)velar fricatives g and ch in Dutch (/x, ɣ/) with glottal h [h, ɦ],. The following differences are listed by their Dutch spelling, as some different letters have merged their sounds in Dutch but remained separate sounds in West-Flemish. Pronunciations can also differ slightly from region to region.

- sch – /sx/ is realised as [ʃh], [sh] or [skʰ] (sh or sk).
- ei – /ɛi/ is realised as [ɛː] or [jɛ] (è or jè).
- ij – /ɛi/ is realised as [i] (short ie, also written as y) and in some words as [y].
- ui – /œy/ is realised as [y] (short u) and in some words as [i].
- au – /ʌu/ is realised as [ɔu] (ow)
- ou – /ʌu/ is realised as [ʊ] (short oe), it is very similar to the long "oe" that is also used in Dutch ([u]), which can cause confusion
- e – /ɛ/ is realised as [æ] or [a].
- i – /ɪ/ is realised as [ɛ].
- ie – /i/ is longer [iː]
- aa – /aː/ is realised as [ɒː].

The absence of /x/ and /ɣ/ in West-Flemish makes pronouncing them very difficult for native speakers. That often causes hypercorrection of the /h/ sounds to a /x/ or /ɣ/.

Standard Dutch also has many words with an -en (/ən/) suffix (mostly plural forms of verbs and nouns). While Standard Dutch and most dialects do not pronounce the final n, the West-Flemish language typically drops the e and pronounces the n inside the base word. For base words already ending with n, the final n sound is often lengthened to clarify the suffix. That makes many words become similar to those of English: beaten, listen etc.

The short o ([ɔ]) can also be pronounced as a short u ([ɐ]), a phenomenon also occurring in Russian and some other Slavic languages, called akanye. That happens spontaneously to some words, but other words keep their original short o sounds. Similarly, the short a ([ɑ]) can turn into a short o ([ɔ]) in some words spontaneously.

The diphthong ui (/œy/) does not exist in West Flemish and is replaced by a long u ([y]) or a long ie ([i]). Like for the ui, the long o ([o]) can be replaced by an [ø] (eu) for some words but a [uo] for others. That often causes similarities to ranchers English.

Here are some examples showing the sound shifts that are part of the vocabulary:

Dutch	West-Flemish (Vlaemsch)	English
vol (short o)	vul [vɐl]	full
zon (short o)	zunne [ˈzɐnːə]	sun
boter (long o)	beuter/beure [ˈbøtər]	butter
boot (long o)	bwoat [buot]	boat
kuiken	kie'n/kiek'n [ˈkiːʔŋ̍]	chick
bruin	brun [bryn]	brown

== Grammar ==
=== Plural form ===
Plural forms in Dutch most often add -en, but West-Flemish usually uses -s. Under the influence of Dutch, -s is being used by fewer people, and younger speakers tend to use -en.

=== Verb conjugation ===
The verbs zijn ("to be") and hebben ("to have") are also conjugated differently.

Dutch	West-Flemish (Vlaemsch)	English	Dutch	West-Flemish (Vloamsch)	English
zijn	zyn	to be	hebben	èn	to have
ik ben	'c zyn	I am	ik heb	'c è	I have
jij bent	ghy zyt	you are	jij hebt	ghy èt	you have
hij is	i.e./èm is	he is	zij heeft	zy èt	she has
wij zijn	wyder zyn	we are	wij hebben	wyder èn	we have
jullie zijn	gyder zyt	you are	jullie hebben	gyder èt	you have
zij zijn	zyder zyn	they are	zij hebben	zyder è	they have

=== Double subject ===
West-Flemish (Vlaemsch) often has a double subject.

Dutch	West-Flemish (Vlaemsch)	English
Jij hebt dat gedaan.	Gh' èt ghy dadde gedôan.	You have done that.
Ik heb dat niet gedaan.	'C enèn ic' ic da nî gedôan.	I didn't do that.

=== Articles ===
Standard Dutch has an indefinite article that does not depend on gender, unlike in West Flemish. However, a gender-independent article is increasingly used. Like in English, n is pronounced only if the next word begins with a vowel sound.

Dutch	West-Flemish (Vloamsch)	English
een stier (m)	e stjiëre	a bull
een koe (f)	e koeie	a cow
een kalf (o)	e kôalve	a calf
een aap (m)	e n'ôap	an ape
een huis (o)	en uus/kot	a house

=== Conjugation of yes and no ===
Another feature of West Flemish is the conjugation of ja and nee ("yes" and "no") to the subject of the sentence. That is somewhat related to the double subject, but even when the rest of the sentence is not pronounced, ja and nee are generally used with the first part of the double subject.

This conjugation can be negated with the extra word, toet ([tut]), or strengthened by adding mo- or ba- (or both).

Dutch	West-Flemish (Vlaemsch)	English
Heb jij dat gedaan? - Ja / Nee	Èje ghy da gedôan? - Jôak / Nink	Did you do that? - Yes / No [I (did/didn't)]
Je hebt dat niet gedaan, hé? - Maar jawel	Gh'èt ghy da nî gedôan, é? - Bajôak	You didn't do that, eh? - On the contrary (But yes I did).
Heeft hij dat gedaan? - Ja / Nee	Èt'n y da gedôan? - Jôan/Nije (Joan / Nin)	Did he do that? - Yes / No [he (did/didn't)]
Heeft zij dat gedaan? - Ja / Nee	È se zy da gedôan? - Jôas/Nins	Did she do that? - Yes / No [she (did/didn't)]
Gaan we verder? - Ja / Nee	Zyn me? - Jôam / Nim	Can we go? - Yes / No [we (can/cannot)]

== See also ==
- Flemish dialects
- Dutch dialects
- Flemish people (Flemings or Vlamingen)
- French Flemish
- Hebban olla vogala
- Westhoek
