= Probatio pennae =

Medieval term for breaking in a new pen

An eleventh-century probatio pennae: one of the first known Dutch language fragments (Hebban olla vogala).

Probatio pennae (also written probatio pennę; in Medieval Latin; literally "pen test") is the medieval term for breaking in a new pen, and used to refer to text written to test a newly cut pen.

A scribe would normally test a newly cut pen to see if it wrote well by writing a few lines of text on a piece of blotting paper. Sometimes these blotting papers survived due to being used afterwards as book binding material; they often provide unique, less "serious" textual material that would otherwise have been lost. A famous example is "Hebban olla vogala", one of the first fragments of Dutch literature, which survived from an eleventh-century probatio pennae in Oxford, Bodleian Library, MS Bodley 340.
