= Law of Hlothhere and Eadric =

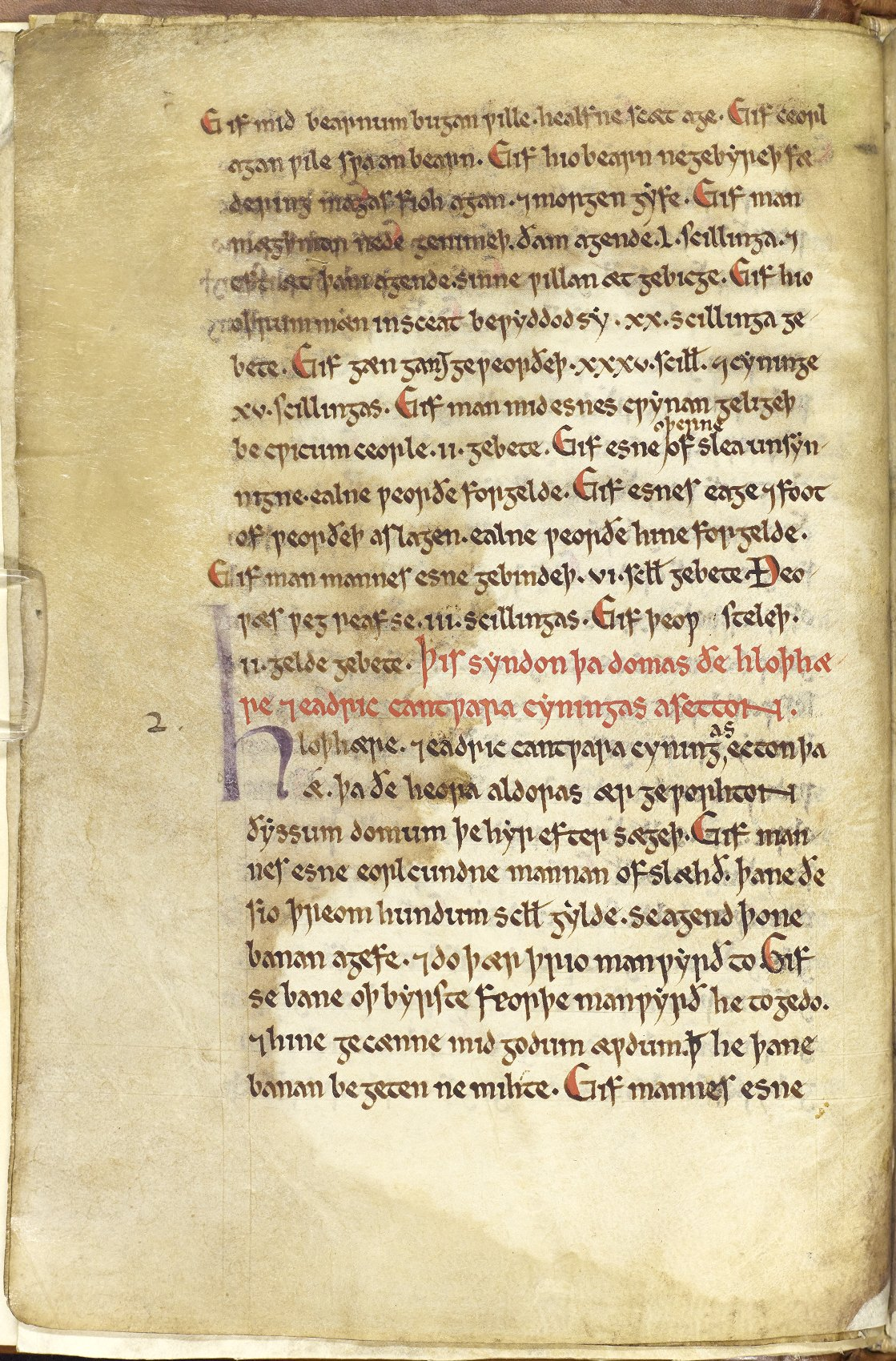
- The Law of Hlothhere and Eadric begins in the middle of folio 3v of the Textus Roffensis.
- Ascribed to: Hloþhere (died 685) and Eadric (died 686), kings of Kent
- Language: Old English
- Date: 7th century
- Principal manuscript(s): Textus Roffensis
- First printed edition: George Hickes and Humfrey Wanley, Linguarum Vett. Septentrionalium Thesaurus Grammatico-Criticus et Archaeologicus (Oxford, 1703–5); see Law of Æthelberht#Manuscript, editions and translations
- Genre: law code

The Law of Hlothhere and Eadric is an Anglo-Saxon legal text. It is attributed to the Kentish kings Hloþhere (died 685) and Eadric (died 686), and thus is believed to date to the second half of the 7th century. It is one of three extant early Kentish codes, along with the early 7th-century Law of Æthelberht and the early 8th-century Law of Wihtred. Written in language more modernised than these, the Law of Hlothhere and Eadric has more focus on legal procedure and has no religious content.

== Provenance ==
The Law, as its name suggests, is attributed to the kings of Kent Hloþhere (died 685) and Eadric (died 686): this is stated in the rubric as well as the prologue of the main text. It is thought that the former reigned from 673 until 685, while Eadric ruled for a year and a half until his death in 686. The text does not indicate that Hloþhere and Eadric ruled together when it was issued, so it is possible that decrees of two reigns were brought together.

Like the other Kentish codes, the Law of Hloþhere and Eadric survives in only one manuscript, known as Textus Roffensis or the "Rochester Codex". This is a compilation of Anglo-Saxon historic and legal material drawn together in the early 1120s under Ernulf, bishop of Rochester. Hloþhere and Eadric's law occupies folios 3^{v} to 5^{r}.

Despite being of similar date, the Old English of Hloþhere and Eadric's law is less archaic than the language of either the Law of Æthelberht (early 7th century) or the Law of Wihtred (early 8th century). The language appears to have been "updated" [Oliver] at a later date, and this may indicate that among the Kentish codes it went through a unique route of transmission, perhaps being more intensely consulted than the other two. It is possible too however that this is an accident of evidence, and that other similarly "updated" versions once existed for the other two codes: they simply were not the versions copied by the Textus Roffensis scribe.

== Content ==
The content consists of a series of domas, "dooms" or judgments, and while providing historical information about Kentish compensation and management of public order, it focuses more on procedure than do the other two Kentish codes. There are eleven distinct groups of provisions according to the text's most recent editor Lisi Oliver, though F. L. Attenborough had previously broken it down into 15. Surprisingly, there are no provisions directly related to the church.

The provisions are ordered according to offence rather, as was the case in the Law of Æthelberht, according to social rank. The content of the law, by provision, is as follows:

- 1. Compensation for the killing of a noble by a servant
- 2. Compensation for the killing of a freeman by a servant
- 3. Accusations of person-stealing and compurgation for the accused
- 4. Provision for the family of dead freemen: maternal custody and the assignment of a male guardian from the paternal kin until a child reaches age 10
- 5. How to deal with stolen property and those possessing it
- 6. How to bring a charge: accusations, sureties and oaths
- 7–9. Fines for insults and disturbing the peace
- 10. Hospitality and responsibility for the behaviour of foreign guests
- 11. Acquisition of property in London (Lundenwic)

The law, particularly provision 6, is important to historians' understanding of the Anglo-Saxon arbitration process. A person, once accused, must take an oath promising to abide by the decision of a judge or accept a fine of 12 shillings. The accuser and accused must try to seek out an arbitrator acceptable to both. Once the judgment is delivered, the one ruled against must make good to the other, or swear on oath that he is innocent. If the accused refuses to co-operate, he is liable to a fine of 100 shillings—a freeman's wergild—and forbidden to swear his innocence in future.

It is also important for showing that the Kentish kingdom had control of London in the late 7th century. Provision 11 rules that Kentish men buying property in London must do so in public in the presence of two or three freemen of good standing or else before the king's wicgerefan, port-reeve. A predecessor of these kings, Eadbald son of Æthelberht (died 640), had issued a coin in London earlier in the 7th century.
