= Vrijberge =

Coordinates: 51°35′3″N 4°10′25″E

Vrijberge was a municipality in the Dutch province of Zeeland, located on the island of Tholen. It existed until 1813, when it was merged with Oud-Vossemeer.

== History ==
Like many other small municipalities in Zeeland at the time, Vrijberge owed its municipal status to the existence of an estate with judicial privileges. After the introduction of the municipal system by the French, almost all of these estates became separate municipalities. However, if no one was willing to keep up with the legal costs of a municipality (taxes etc.), it was merged with a neighbouring town. Vrijberge came into existence in the 18th century after some previously flooded areas were again turned into habitable land, through the erection of dykes. It was through the management of these polders that Vrijberge gained its own small administration. The area, like most of Tholen, was flooded during the 1953 North Sea storm flood. Vrijberge, with less than 50 inhabitants, had by then already ceased to be of any importance. Since 1970 the whole island of Tholen is administered as a single municipality.

== Heraldry ==
Because Vrijberge's municipality was so quickly dissolved, it never came to officially possess a coat of arms. The coat of arms of the former estate was horizontally divided, argent over gules, with a charge of three roses gules on the argent and three sheep argent on the gules. Based on these arms, a flag (an armorial banner) was later designed for Vrijberge.
