= Nieuw-Vossemeer =

- Village
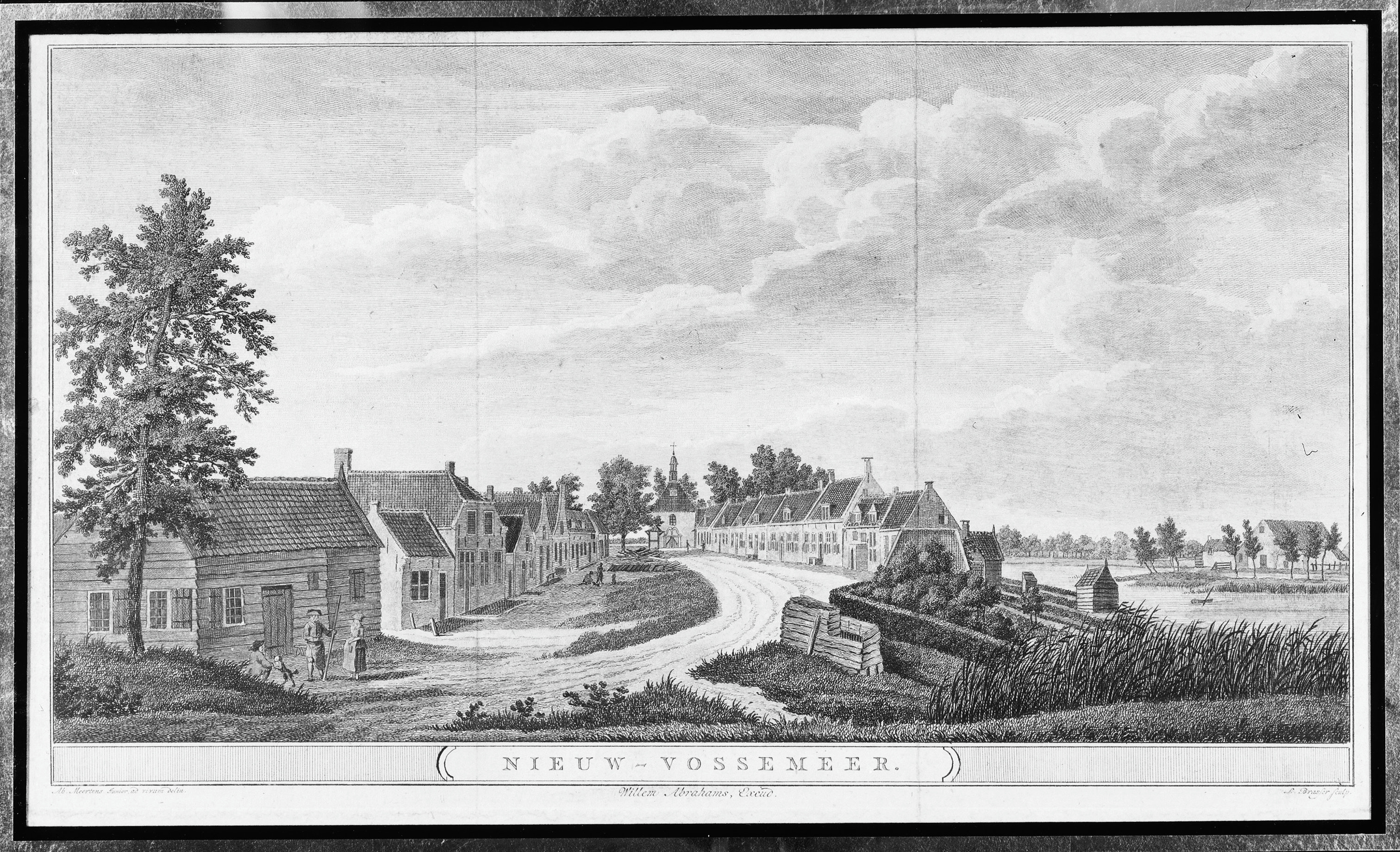
- View on Nieuw-Vossemeer

- Coat of arms

- Location in the province of North Brabant in the Netherlands Nieuw-Vossemeer (Netherlands)
- Coordinates: 51°35′N 4°13′E
- Country: Netherlands
- Province: North Brabant
- Municipality: Steenbergen

Area
  - Total: 0.88 km^{2} (0.34 sq mi)
- Elevation: 1.0 m (3.3 ft)

Population (2021)
  - Total: 1,960
  - Density: 2,200/km^{2} (5,800/sq mi)
- Time zone: UTC+1 (CET)
  - Summer (DST): UTC+2 (CEST)
- Postal code: 4681
- Dialing code: 0167

Nieuw-Vossemeer is a village in the Dutch province of North Brabant. It is located in the municipality of Steenbergen, about 10 km northeast of Bergen op Zoom.

== History ==
The village was first mentioned between 1573 and 1576 as Nijeuwe Vossemaer, which means "new fresh water stream". Nieuw (new) has been added to distinguish between Oud-Vossemeer. The first village was established in 1566 after the land had been poldered, however the land was inundated in 1583 to thwart the progress of the Spanish Army. The current village was built around 1610, and has the main street at right angles from the dike with the church on the end of the street.

The Dutch Reformed church was built in 1649 as a simple aisleless church. In 1849, it was plastered and a tower was added. In 1969, it was returned to its original shape. The Catholic St John the Baptist Church was built in 1873 in Gothic Revival style and extended in 1929. The grist mill Assumburg was built in 1897. During the North Sea flood of 1953, the wind mill was damaged, but the miller and his whole family died. It was restored between 1955 and 1958, and houses a mill museum since 1968. The wind mill is no longer in service.

Nieuw-Vossemeer was home to 882 people in 1840. The town was flooded during the 1953 North Sea flood, and severely damaged. Nieuw-Vossemeer was a separate municipality until 1997, when it became part of Steenbergen.

== Gallery ==
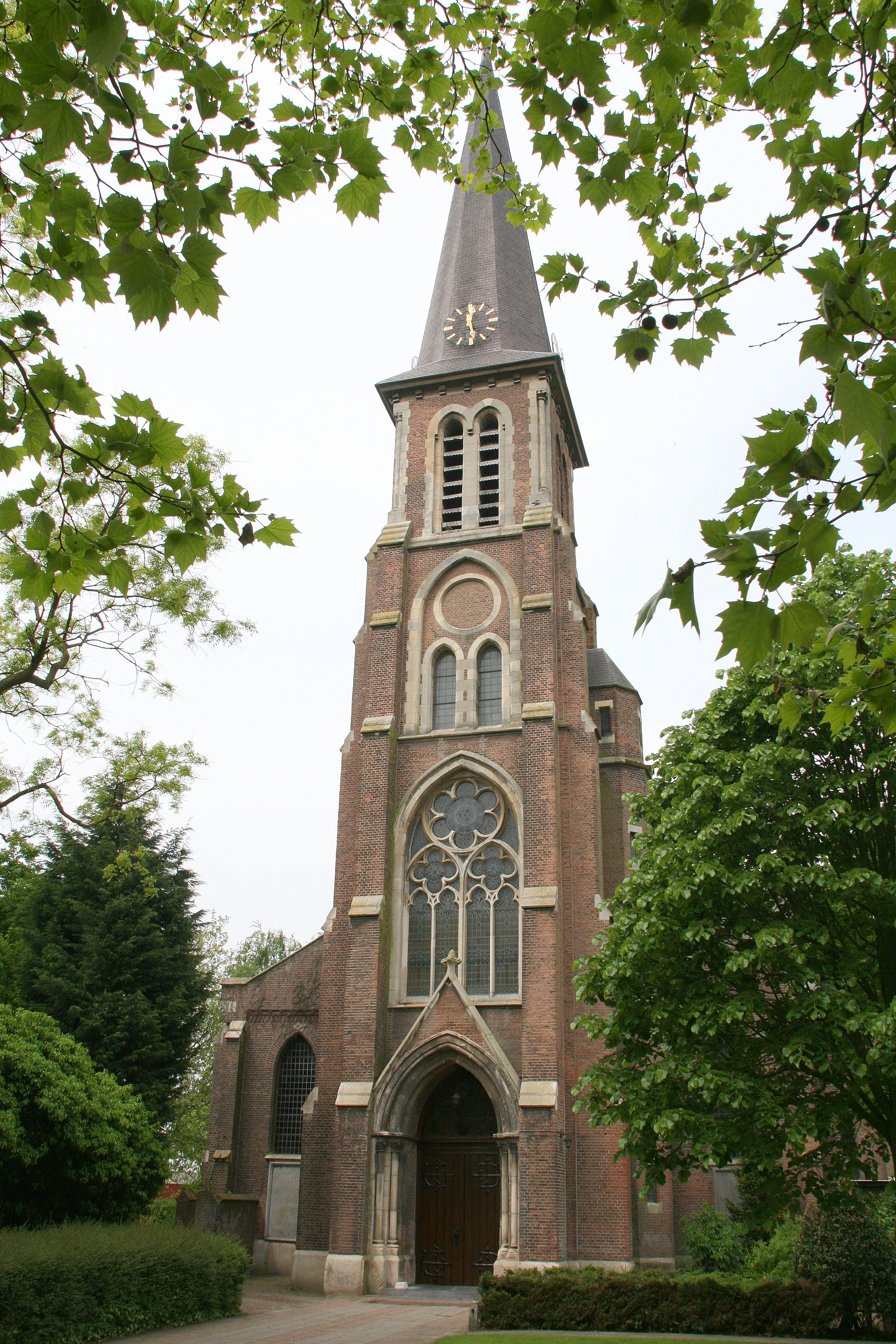
St John the Baptist Church

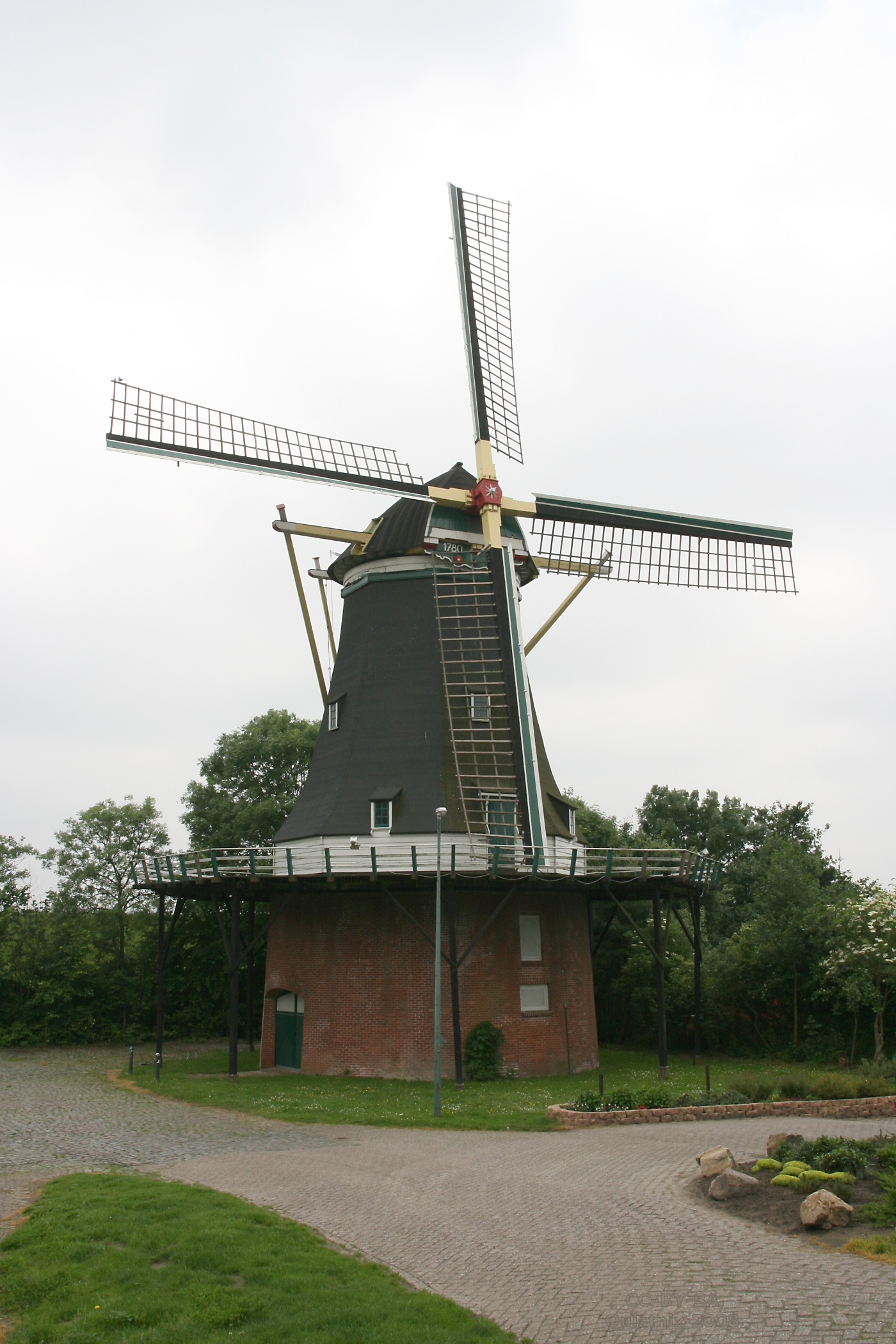
Wind mill Assumburg

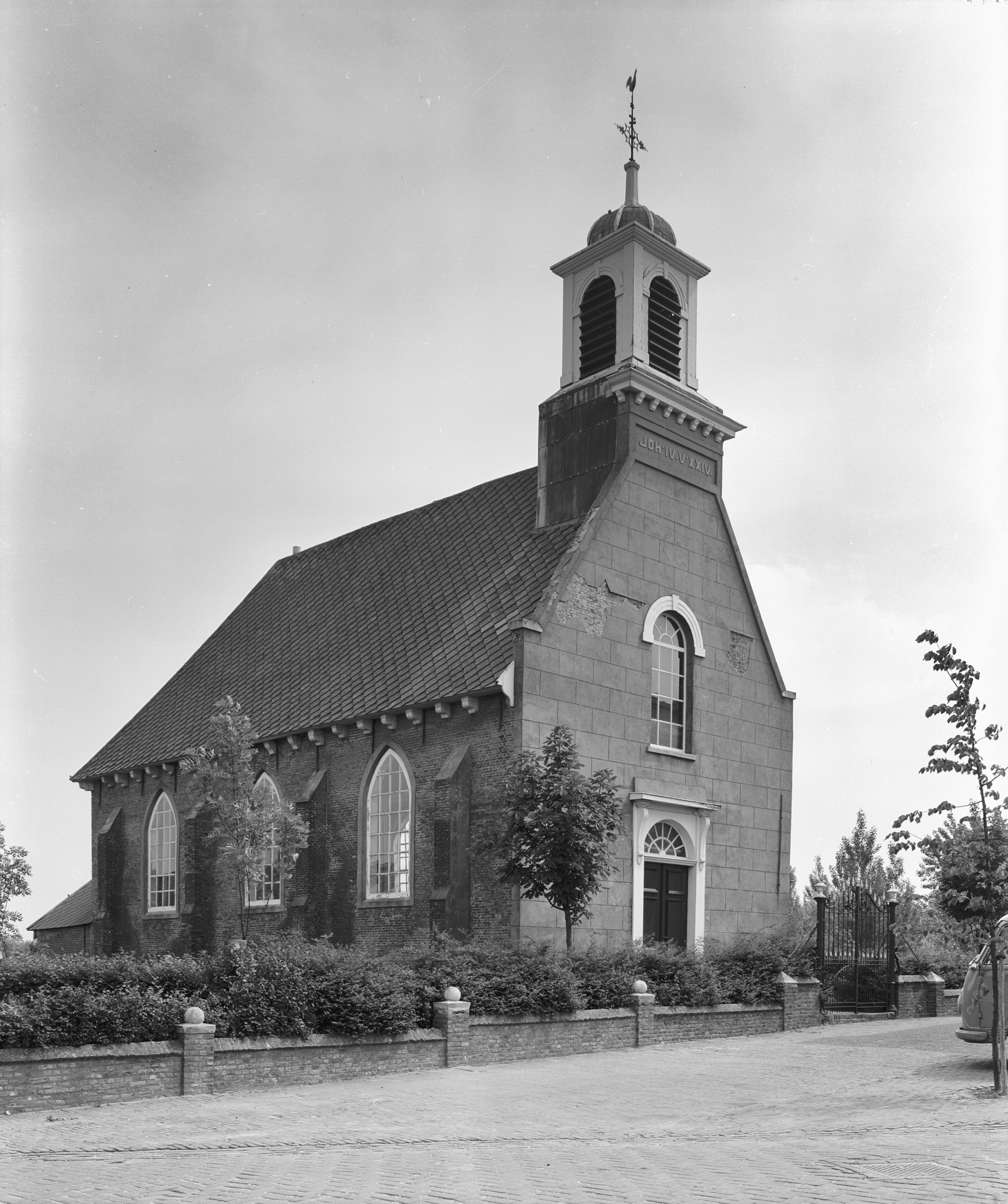
Dutch Reformed church
