= Law of Æthelberht =

Set of Legal Provisions, first known document in English

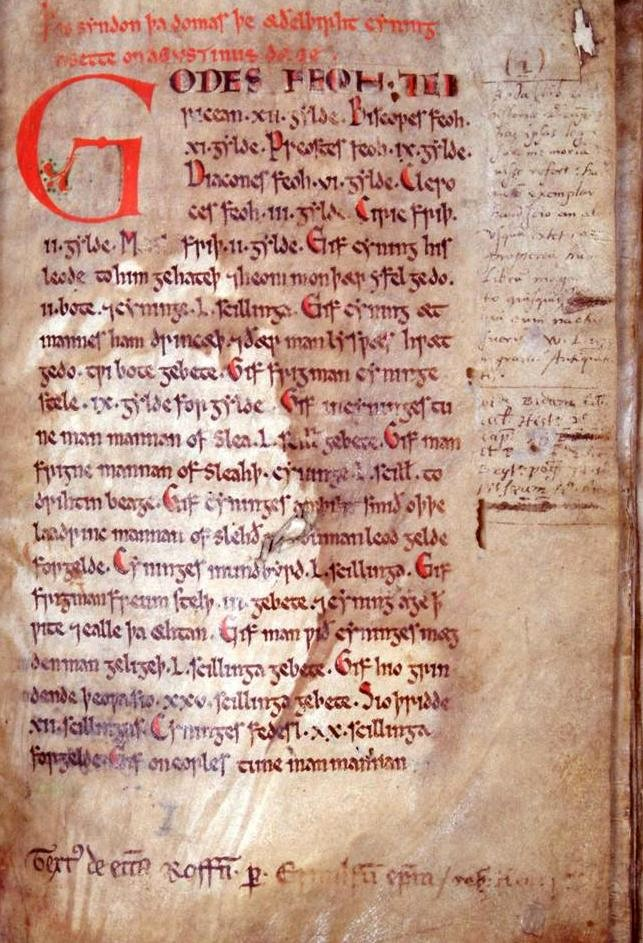
- Opening folio of the code
- Ascribed to: Æthelberht, king of Kent
- Language: Old English
- Date: 7th century
- Principal manuscript(s): Textus Roffensis
- First printed edition: George Hickes and Humfrey Wanley, Linguarum Vett. Septentrionalium Thesaurus Grammatico-Criticus et Archaeologicus (Oxford, 1703–05)
- Genre: law code

The Law of Æthelberht is a set of legal provisions written in Old English, probably dating to the early 7th century. It originates in the kingdom of Kent, and is the first Germanic-language law code. It is also thought to be the earliest example of a document written in English, or indeed in any form of a still-spoken Germanic language, though extant only in an early 12th-century manuscript, Textus Roffensis.

The code is concerned primarily with preserving social harmony through compensation and punishment for personal injury, typical of Germanic-origin legal systems. Compensations are arranged according to social rank, descending from king to slave. The initial provisions of the code offer protection to the church. Though the latter were probably innovations, much of the remainder of the code may be derived from earlier legal custom transmitted orally.

== Manuscript, editions and translations ==
There is only one surviving manuscript of Æthelberht's law, Textus Roffensis or the "Rochester Book". The Kentish laws occupy folios 1^{v} to 6^{v}, of which Æthelberht's has 1^{v} to 3^{v}. This is a compilation of Anglo-Saxon laws, lists and genealogies drawn together in the early 1120s, half a millennium after Æthelberht's law is thought to have been first written down. Æthelberht's law precedes the other Kentish law codes, which themselves precede various West Saxon and English royal legislation, as well as charters relating to Rochester Cathedral. Æthelberht's law is written in the same hand as the laws of other Kentish monarchs.

The compilation was produced at the instigation of Ernulf, bishop of Rochester, friend of the lawyer-bishop Ivo of Chartres. Ernulf was a legally minded bishop like Ivo, a canon lawyer and judge. He was responsible for commissioning copies of the Anglo-Saxon Chronicle at Canterbury Cathedral Priory and Peterborough Abbey, as prior and abbot respectively.

Francis Tate made a transcription of Textus Roffensis c. 1589, which survives as British Museum MS Cotton Julius CII. Henry Spelman, Ecclesiarum Orbis Brittanici (London, 1639), provided a Latin translation of provisions relating to the church. In 1640 Johannes de Laet translated the whole code into Latin. Though no original survives, several 18th-century authors copied it. The first full edition (with Latin translation) was:

- George Hickes and Humfrey Wanley, Linguarum Vett. Septentrionalium Thesaurus Grammatico-Criticus et Archaeologicus (Oxford, 1703–05)

Many other Latin translations editions of the Kentish laws or Textus Roffensis followed in the 18th, 19th and 20th centuries, mostly from English and German editors. Notable examples include:

- Felix Liebermann, Die Gesetze der Angelsachsen (Halle, 1897–1916), with German translation
- Frederick Levi Attenborough, The Laws of the Earliest English Kings (Cambridge, 1922), with English translation
- Lisi Oliver, The Beginnings of English Law (Toronto, 2002), with English translation

In 2014, Rochester Cathedral and the John Rylands University Library of Manchester cooperated to make the complete text available online in facsimile.

== Origin ==
The code is attributed to Æthelberht, and for this reason is dated to that king's reign (c. 590–616×618). Æthelberht's code is thought to be both the earliest law code of any kind in any Germanic language and the earliest surviving document written down in the English language. Æthelberht is thought to be the king behind the code because the law's red-ink introductory rubric in Textus Roffensis attributes it to him.

Bede (Historia Ecclesiastica ii. 5), writing in Northumbria more than a century after King Æthelberht, attributes a code of laws to the king:

Among the other benefits which he thoughtfully conferred on his people, he also established enacted judgments for them, following the examples of the Romans, with the council of his wise men. These were written in English speech, and are held and observed by them to this day.

Bede goes on to describe details of the code accurately. In the introduction to Alfred the Great's law the latter king relates that he consulted the laws of Æthelberht.

The code as it survives was not written in the king's name and the 12th-century author of the rubric may have been influenced by Bede in his attribution. The lack of attribution in the original text may be a sign that law-making was not primarily a royal activity as it was to become in later centuries.

There is evidence that much of the code was taken from pre-existing customary practice transmitted orally. The church provisions aside, the code's structure looks like an "architectural mnemonic", proceeding from top to bottom. It begins with the king and ends with slaves. Likewise, the section on personal injuries, which contains most of the code's provisions, begins with hair at the top of the body and ends with the toenail. Use of poetic devices such as consonance and alliteration also indicate the text's oral background. Æthelberht's law is hence largely derived from ælþeaw, established customary law, rather than royal domas, "judgements".

It is not clear why the code was written down however. The suggested date coincides with the coming of Christianity—the religion of the Romans and Franks—to the English of Kent. The code may be an attempt to imitate the Romans and establish the Kentish people as a respectable "civilised" people. Christianity and writing were furthered too by the Kentish king's marriage to Bertha, daughter of the Frankish king Charibert I. There have been suggestions that Augustine of Canterbury may have urged it. Legal historian Patrick Wormald argued that it followed a model from the 614 Frankish church council in Paris, which was attended by the abbot of St Augustine's Abbey and the bishop of Rochester. The wergeld ratios for churchmen in Æthelberht's code are similar to those of other Germanic laws, like Lex Ribuaria and the Swabian and Bavarian laws.

== Content and language ==
Patrick Wormald divided the text into the following sections (the chapter numbers are those in Frederick Levi Attenborough's Laws of the Earliest English Kings and in Lisi Oliver's Beginnings of English Law):

1. Compensation for churchmen [Attenborough: 1; Oliver: 1–7]
2. Compensation for the king and his dependents [Attenborough: 2–12; Oliver: 8–17]
3. Compensation for an eorl and his dependents [Attenborough: 13–14; Oliver: 18–19]
4. Compensation for a ceorl and his dependents [Attenborough: 15–25, 27–32; Oliver: 20–26, 28–32]
5. Compensation for the semi-free [Attenborough: 26–27; Oliver: 26–27]
6. Personal injuries [Attenborough: 33–72; Oliver: 33–71]
7. Compensation and injuries concerning women [Attenborough: 73–84; Oliver: 72–77]
8. Compensation for servants [Attenborough: 85–88; Oliver: 78–81]
9. Compensation for slaves [Attenborough: 89–90; Oliver: 82–83]

Another legal historian, Lisi Oliver, offered a similar means of division:

1. Offences against the church and secular public assembly [Oliver: 1–7]
2. Offences relating to the king and his household [Oliver: 1–7]
3. Offences against eorlas ("noblemen") [Oliver: 8–17]
4. Offences against ceorlas ("freemen") [Oliver: 20–32]
5. Personal injury offences [Oliver: 33–71]
6. Offences against women [Oliver: 72–77]
7. Offences against esnas ("semi-free", "servants") [Oliver: 78–81]
8. Offences against þeowas ("slaves") [Oliver: 81–83]

In addition to protecting church property, the code offers a fixed means of making social conflict and its escalation less likely and ending feud by "righting wrongs" [Wormald]. Two units of currency are used, the scilling and the sceatt. In Æthelberht's day a sceatt was a unit of gold with the weight of a grain of barley, with 20 sceattas per scilling. One ox was probably valued at one scilling or "shilling".

The law is written in Old English, and there are many archaic features to the code's language. For instance, it uses an instrumental "dative of quantity" [Oliver] that is obsolete in later Old English grammar: Gif friman edor gegangeð, iiii scillingum gebete ("If a freeman enters an enclosure, let him pay with 4 shillings"). This is a construction found in other West Germanic languages but not elsewhere in Old English except once in the Laws of Hlothhere and Eadric (2.1). As another example, in the apodosis the verb is always in the end position in Æthelberht's law; while this is grammatical in Old English, it is an archaic construction for a legal text.

Words such as mæthlfrith ("assembly peace") drihtinbeage ("lord-payment"), leodgeld ("person-price"), hlaf-ætan ("loaf-eater"), feaxfang ("seizing of hair") and mægðbot ("maiden-compensation") are either absent in other Old English texts or very rare. The meanings of some of these words are debated: for example, the word læt, which occurs as a simplex only in Æthelberht's law-code, seems to mean some kind of freedman. Some past scholarship has supposed that it specifically means people from the ethnically British population of Kent, whereas other work (including Lisi Oliver's) has concluded that it is a term denoting social status with no ethnic connotations. Doubling vowels to indicate length (for instance, taan, "foot"), common to all written insular languages in the early Middle Ages but increasingly uncommon later on, occurs three times in Æthelberht's code but not elsewhere in Textus Roffensis.
