= Textus Roffensis =

Mediaeval manuscript

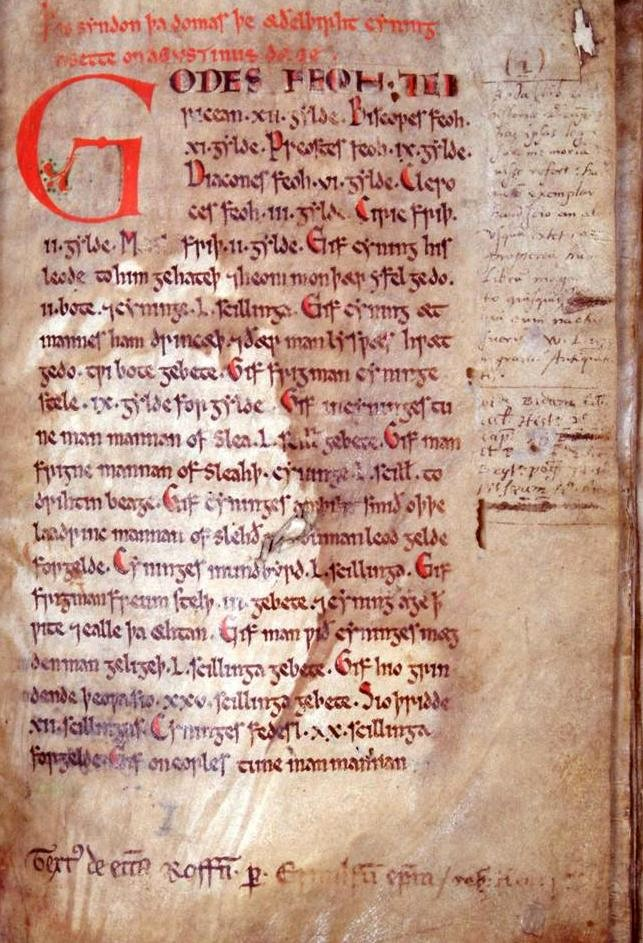
The first page of the Textus Roffensis. From Rochester Cathedral Library, MS A.3.5; formerly in the Medway Studies Centre, now in the crypt of Rochester Cathedral.

The Textus Roffensis (Latin for "The Tome of Rochester"), fully titled the Textus de Ecclesia Roffensi per Ernulphum episcopum ("The Tome of the Church of Rochester up to Bishop Ernulf") and sometimes also known as the Annals of Rochester, is a mediaeval manuscript that consists of two separate works written between 1122 and 1124. It is catalogued as "Rochester Cathedral Library, MS A.3.5" and as of 2023 is currently on display in a new exhibition at Rochester Cathedral in Rochester, Kent.

It is thought that the main text of both manuscripts was written by a single scribe, although the English glosses to the two Latin entries (items 23 and 24 in table below) were made by a second hand. The annotations might indicate that the manuscript was consulted in some post-Conquest trials. The glosses are very sparse and just clarify a few uncertain terms. For example, the entry on f. 67r merely explains that the triplex iudiciu(m) is called in English, ofraceth ordel (insult ordeal = triple ordeal).

There is a clear, digitised version in the Rylands Medieval Collection.

== Contents ==
The first part is a collection of laws and other, primarily secular documents, whilst the second is the cartulary of the Cathedral priory. The first part is of fundamental importance to the study of Anglo-Saxon law. It begins with the earliest surviving royal law-code, from King Æthelberht of Kent, dating to c 600, followed by those of two Kentish successors, the joint kings Hlothere and Eadric, c 679–85, and Wihtred, 695. This is the only manuscript source for these three laws. Wihtred's are heavily reliant on the laws of the contemporary West-Saxon King, Ine (see item 6 below). The full contents of the first part are:

Item	Dates	Description	Manuscript Pages	Language
1	c. 600	Æthelberht's Laws	1r–3v	English
2	c. 679–695	Hlothere and Eadric's Laws	3v–5r	English
3	c. 695	Wihtred's Laws	5r–6v	English
4	Early 11th century	Hadbot (compensation for the ordained)	7r–v	English
5	?	Lists of Kings (West-Saxon genealogy), Saints and Bishops	7v–8v	English
6	Probably after 893; Laws of Ine, c. 694	Laws of Alfred, (Alfred's Domboc), containing the Laws of his West-Saxon predecessor, Ine	9r–32r	English
7	?	Ordal	32r–v	English
8	990s	Walreaf (penalties for grave-robbery)	32v	English
9	924–939	Æthelstan's Grately Law Code (II Aethelstan)	32v–37r	English
10	924–939	Æthelstan's Exeter Law Code (V Aethelstan) and a fragment from the London Code (VI Æthelstan, 6)	37r–38r	English
11	990s	Pax ('Peace'), for use in Æthelred's Danelaw territories	38r	English
12	Early 11th century	Mircna laga	38v–39v	English
13	c. early 11th Century	Fraudulent peace Treaty between Edward the Elder and Guthrum	40r–41v	English
14	10th century?	Wer (on bloodfeud)	41v–42r	English
15	899–924	Edward the Elder's First Law Code	42r–43r	English
16	899–924	Edward the Elder's Second Law Code	43r–44r	English
17	942–946	Edmund's First Law Code (ecclesiastical laws)	44r–45r	English
18	942–946	Edmund's Second Law Code	45r–46r	English
19	c. 997	Æthelred's First Law Code (Woodstock Code)	46r–47r	English
20	1066–1087	Willelmes cyninges asetnysse (laws of William I dealing with lawsuits by Englishmen against Frenchmen) (Note: The only surviving version is in Textus Roffensis.)	47r–v	English
21	997	Æthelred's Third Law Code (Wantage Code)	48r–49v	English
22	Post-1066	Judgement of God X (Iud Dei XV)	49v–57r	Latin
23	1016–1035	a text of Cnut's reign	57v	Latin
24	1016–1035	Institutes of Cnut (collection of laws)	58r–80r	Latin
25	1066–1087	Articles of William I (Note: Not entirely William's actual laws: see http://www.earlyenglishlaws.ac.uk/laws/texts/wl-art/)	80r–81v	Latin
26	?	Accusatores (Excerpts from the Collectio Lanfranci and other materials on procedural law)	81v–87r	Latin
27	c 1008	Æthelstan's Sixth Law Code (London Code)	88r–93r	English
28	?	Geðyncðo (On status)	93r–v	English
29	No later than mid-10th Century	Norðleoda laga (concerns wergeld in Northumbrian society)	93v–94r	English
30	?	Wifmannes beweddung (Of a woman's betrothal)	94v–95r	English
31	?	Cattle-Theft Charm	95r	English
32	?	Hit becwæð (On bequests: 'he that owned it bequeathed it and died')	95r–v	English
33	1100	Henry I's Coronation Charter	96r–97v	Latin
34	10th–11th century	Excommunicatio VIII (laws on excommunication	98r–99v	Latin
35	?	Excommunicatio IX (formula for excommunicating criminals)	99v–100r	Latin
36	?	List of Kings	100r–v	English
37	?	Lists of Kings, Saints, and Bishops: West-Saxon Genealogy	102r–104r	English
38	?	Lists of Kings, Saints, and Bishops: Lists of Popes, Emperors, Patriarchs and English Archbishops and Bishops	105r–116r	English
39	?	Lists: of 24 elders, of popes responsible for various liturgical reforms, and of 7 archangels	116v	Latin

The second part of Textus Roffensis is just over 100 pages long. It consists of the cartulary for Rochester Cathedral, in Latin. Its final entry (222r–v) is in English, listing the number of masses to be recited for those institutions in England and Normandy which were in confraternity with Rochester.

== Name ==
A textus was a book with a decorated cover suitable to be kept in the church by the high altar. The term does not mean a text concerning Rochester Cathedral. A liber was a less decorated book, suitable only for the cloister. It is rare that a secular book is a textus, and the name given to the Textus Roffensis by the cathedral is considered indicative of the book's importance during the Middle Ages.

== The Textus Roffensis Scribe ==
The unknown scribe was remarkable for his knowledge of old forms of English, and was able to transcribe accurately from a range of original manuscripts written in Anglo-Saxon dialects, including the local Kentish used for the laws of the kings of Kent. Two or more generations after the Norman Conquest of 1066, this was distinctly unusual. Few of his records were contemporary and, to read the Laws of Aethelberht, he was looking back at an obsolete dialect of early Anglo-Saxon English, some 500 years old.

He followed standard practice of distinguishing between written English and written Latin. The overall aspect is Protogothic with, for example, narrow letter-forms and forked tops to ascenders. He used a modified Insular Minuscule for the English and a modified Caroline Minuscule for the Latin. This was standard practice in the years around 1000, but proficiency in writing Insular Minuscule was in terminal decline by the time of the Textus Roffensis.

The double-page opening of f95v and f96r is a good place to examine differences in the two scripts. The left-hand page contains the end of Hit becƿæð. ond becƿæl in English and the right-hand page the start of Henry I's Coronation Charter, in Latin. It is not only the general letter-shapes which show some differences. In the English, the only abbreviations are the tironian et for ond and the suspensions on dative endings e.g. beÞinū/ beminū for –um (concerning yours/ - mine). The number of abbreviations, suspensions and ligatures in the Latin give a different look, accentuated by different letter-forms, such as g, h and r in gehyrde (f.95v, line 11) and erga uos habeo (f.96r, line 9); the f in forðam (English, line 10) and in facio (Latin, line 10)

The Roffensis scribe made remarkably few errors and only some minor edits which lightly modernise the text. This can be seen in the Laws of Ine. The original laws were written in the late seventh century. They were already updated when recorded in Alfred's Domboc two centuries later. The earliest preserved version is from c. 925.

In clause 2, this has Cild binnan ðritegum nihta sie gefulwad ('a child shall be baptised within thirty days'). The scribe substitutes for the tenth-century term for baptism (gefulwad) the twelfth-century term gefullod. Similarly, the scribe substitutes þeow (slave) for Alfred's fioh (wealth). There is some dispute whether this reflects the changing position of slaves after the Conquest or whether it is just correcting the term, since slaves were chattels.

Overall, the Roffensis scribe treated his sources with respect. He did not, for example, make erroneous 'corrections' to the Old English law texts, unlike the "incompetent translations of Quadripartitus's author".

== History ==
The two manuscripts were bound together in around 1300. The first part is a collection of documents which includes the Law of Æthelberht, attributed to Æthelberht of Kent (c. 560–616), and the 1100 coronation charter of Henry I of England. The Law of Æthelberht is the oldest surviving English law code and the oldest Anglo-Saxon text in existence. The second part of the Textus Roffensis is the oldest of the Rochester Cathedral registers. The entire volume consists of 235 vellum leaves.

Over the centuries, the Textus Roffensis has been loaned, lost and recovered on several occasions and has been in the custody of a variety of different people and places. It was once held at the Medway Archives Office in Strood under reference number DRc/R1 and has since been withdrawn. It is currently held in an airtight case in Rochester Cathedral's Crypt. Sometime between 1708 and 1718 the book was immersed for several hours in either the River Thames or the River Medway when the ship transporting it overturned. Water damage is apparent on a number of pages.

The book was named 'Britain's Hidden Treasure' by the British Library, and was the subject of a conference at the University of Kent in 2010. It has been digitised and published on line by The University of Manchester's Centre for Heritage Imaging and Collection Care. The full digital facsimile is available through Rochester Cathedral's website.

In 2014, a short film was produced about the book by Rochester Cathedral about its history and digitization process.

== Sources ==
- Treharne, Elaine. "Textus Roffensis". The Production and Use of English Manuscripts 1060 to 1220. University of Leicester.
- "England's 'Hidden Treasure' is the focus of Kent conference and exhibition". University of Kent. 2010.
- "Textus Roffensis". John Rylands Library. (online facsimile)
