= Eadric =

Eadric, alternatively spelled Edric or Edrick, is a name of Anglo-Saxon or Jute origin and may refer to:

- Eadric of Kent (died c. 686), king of Kent from 685 to 686
- Eadric Streona (died 1017), ealdorman of Mercia under Æthelred II and Cnut
- Eadric the Wild, leader of resistance against the Norman Conquest between 1068 and 1070
- Edric Gifford, 3rd Baron Gifford (1849–1911), English recipient of the Victoria Cross
- Edric Bastyan (1903–1980), British governor of South Australia and Tasmania
- Edric Connor (1913–1968), American singer and actor
- Edrick Floreal (born 1966), Canadian athlete
- Edrick Lee (born 1992), Australian rugby league footballer

The name may also refer to the following fictional characters:

- Edric (Dune), a character from Frank Herbert's 1969 science fiction novel Dune Messiah
- Edrik (Dune), a character from the Brian Herbert and Kevin J. Anderson novels Hunters of Dune (2006) and Sandworms of Dune (2007)
- Edric Blight, a character from the animated television series The Owl House

== See also ==
- Edrich
