= Norðleoda laga =

Norðleoda laga ('Laws of the North-People') is a set of laws apparently pertaining to the Anglo-Saxon kingdom of Northumbria. Mention of a Northumbrian king suggests that the text originates before the mid-tenth century, when Northumbria ceased to be an independent kingdom. The text comprises a list of the wergelds payable on the killing of people of different social statuses, with the following values:

Rank	Thrymsa
King	30,000
Archbishop/aetheling	15,000
Bishop/ealdorman	8,000
Hold/high-reeve	4,000
Mass-thegn/secular thegn	2,000
Prospering ceorl	2,000
Ceorl	200
Prospering Welshman	120s.
Non-prospering Welshman	80s.
Landless Welshman	70s.

== Editions and translations ==
- Liebermann, F. (ed.), Die Gesetze der Angelsachsen, 3 vols (Halle a. S.: Niemeyer, 1903–16), I 458–60.
- Monk, Chris (ed. and trans.), Norðleoda Laga (‘Laws of the Northumbrians’), Textus Roffensis, ff. 93v-94r (Rochester: Rochester Cathedral Research Guild, 2018)
