= Crondall Hoard =

Anglo-Saxon gold coins found in England

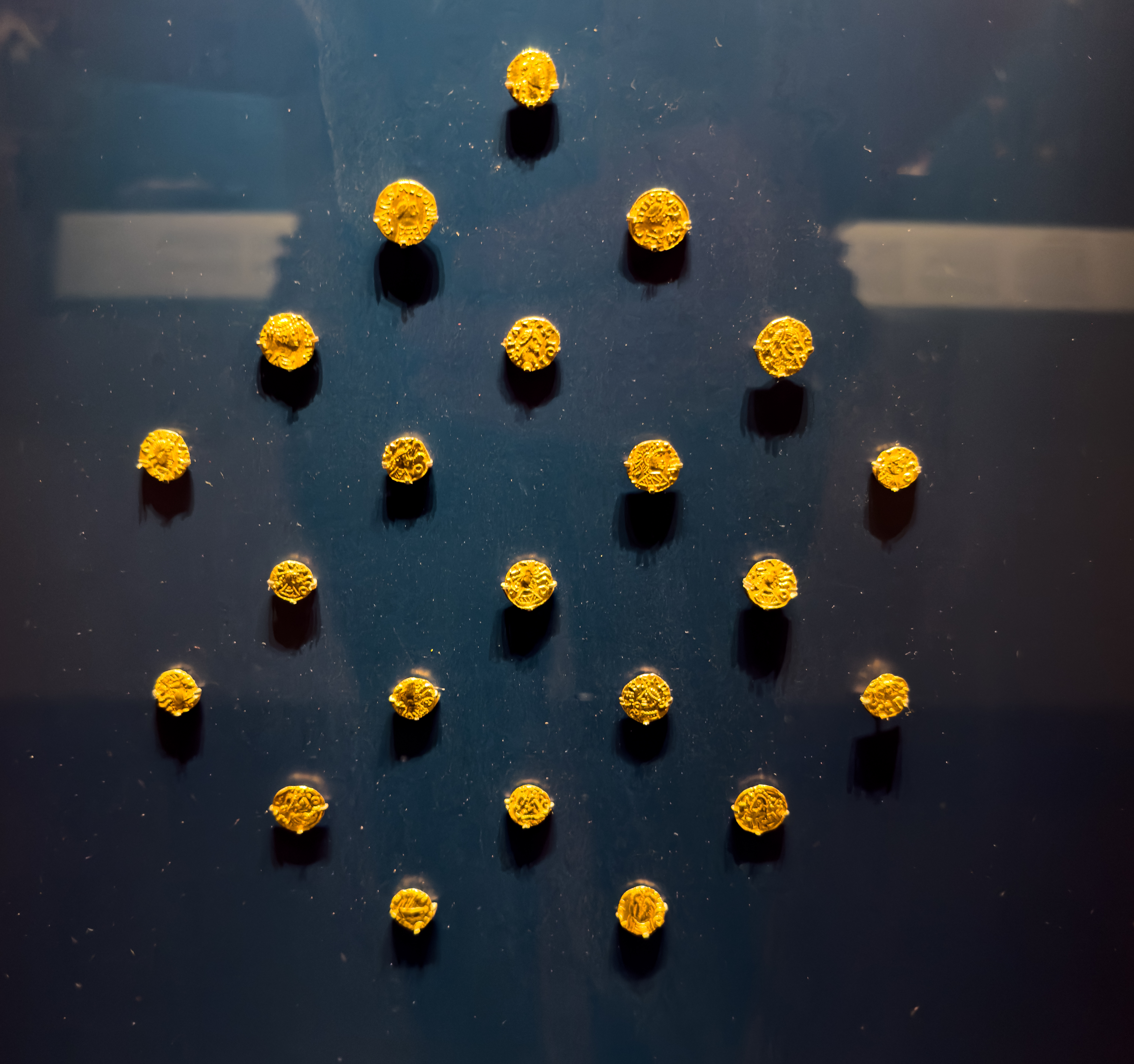
Coins from the Hoard on display at the Ashmolean Museum

The Crondall Hoard is a hoard of coins and other articles that was found in the village of Crondall in the English county of Hampshire. The hoard was discovered in 1828 and is believed to date to the seventh century. It was the largest hoard of Anglo-Saxon gold coins found prior to the 21st century. The coins are now in the collection of the Ashmolean Museum at Oxford.

The hoard was accidentally discovered by Charles Lefroy on his family's estate in 1828. As discovered it comprised 97 gold coins, together with three unstruck gold planchets and one gold-plated object that could have been a coin forgery. There were also a pair of jewelled ornaments, together with small chains that Lefroy thought may have been the remains of a pouch that had once held the coins and jewellery. Of the 97 coins, 73 were Anglo-Saxon thrymsa and 24 were Merovingian or Frankish tremissis. The consensus amongst historians is that hoard dates from between 635 AD and about 650 AD.

It is not possible to know if the coins were hidden or lost by accident. It has been suggested by the numismatist and historian Philip Grierson that the hoard may be a wergild, compensation paid to the family of someone killed by the killer. Grierson noted that under the laws of the Kingdom of Kent the wergild for killing a free Anglo-Saxon was 100 gold shillings and this matched the amount of gold in the hoard. However, there is no certainty that the 100 coins and blanks recovered by Lefroy was the whole of the hoard, and the place where the hoard was found was actually in the Kingdom of Wessex, where the wergild tariffs were different.

After discovery, the hoard remained in the Lefroy family until 1895 when it was sold to the 5th Lord Grantley. The fate of the three gold blanks, the possible forgery and the jewellery items is unknown, but all the coins were sold after Grantley's death in 1943 to the numismatic firm A H Baldwin & Sons. They in turn passed them on, at cost price, to the Ashmolean Museum, where they are on display. The hoard is of considerable historical significance, as it is the only large hoard of Anglo-Saxon thrymsa ever found, and a great deal of current knowledge of Anglo-Saxon gold coinage is the result of studying this hoard.
