= Coinage in Anglo-Saxon England =

Coinage in Anglo-Saxon England refers to the use of coins, either for monetary value or for other purposes, in Anglo-Saxon England.

Archaeologists have uncovered large quantities of coins dating to the Anglo-Saxon period, either from hoards or stray finds, making them one of the most plentiful kinds of artefact that survive from this period. Numismatist M.A.S. Blackburn noted that they provide "a valuable source of evidence for economic, administrative and political history." In recent years, the growth of the metal detecting hobby has allowed many more individual coins not in hoards to be discovered, helping to guide current research.

== History ==
=== 5th to 7th centuries ===
Early in the 5th century, when Britannia, broadly comprising what is now England and Wales, ceased to be a province of the Roman Empire, the production of coinage effectively came to an end and a non-monetary economy developed. During the 5th century, Anglo-Saxon tribal groups from continental Europe migrated to central and southern Britain, introducing their own language, polytheistic religion and culture. Although gold coins from continental Europe were traded into Anglo-Saxon England at Kent, they were initially used for decorative purposes, only beginning to be used as money in the early part of the 7th century.

The first Anglo-Saxon coins were produced by Eadbald of Kent around AD 625, although sustained production would not appear for several more years. These were small, gold coins, called scillingas (shillings) in surviving Anglo-Saxon law codes, although they have since been referred to as thrymsas by numismatists. Modelled on coins produced at the same time in Merovingian Francia – geographically the rough equivalent of modern France – these early Anglo-Saxon gold shillings were often inscribed with words borrowed from either Merovingian or Roman coinage, although examples have been found which instead bear such names as those of King Eadbald of Kent, the moneyers Witmen and Pada, or the names of mints in London and Canterbury. However, as the 7th century progressed, the gold coins produced grew increasingly pale until they were replaced by small, thick, silver coins known as sceattas around the year 675. These sceattas were also produced in England, as well as in Germanic continental areas of the North Sea coast, from about 680 to 750, bearing designs which featured a wide range of iconography.

In about 675 the gold shilling was superseded by the silver penning, or penny, amongst the Anglo-Saxons, and this would remain the principal English monetary denomination until the mid-14th century, during the Late Medieval period. Early silver pennies were typically decorated with geometric or pictorial designs, occasionally having the name of the moneyer inscribed on them. More rarely, coins produced in the kingdoms of Northumbria and East Anglia bore the names of monarchs. Early pennies were made with silver from the Byzantine Empire.

=== 8th to 11th centuries ===
The silver became increasingly debased in the early eighth century, probably because the Byzantine supply was drying up. Fineness improved in the middle of the century with the introduction of a new supply from the silver mines in Melle in southwest France. Eadberht of Northumbria instituted control over the production of his silver coinage around AD 740, control that was followed by the other early English kings in the years after.

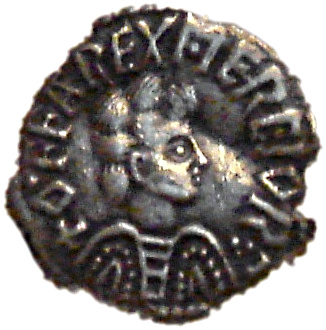
Coin of Offa, king of Mercia, 757-796, with the Latin legend OFFA REX MERCIOR; British coins still carry Latin inscriptions in the 21st century.

In the latter part of the 8th century a new style of silver penny appeared in Anglo-Saxon England, thinner and commonly bearing the names of both the king and the moneyer who had struck it. This new type of penny was apparently first introduced in the reign of the Mercian King Offa in about 760.

From the 9th century, monarchs and their governments gained greater power over the control of coin production, and the designs used by different moneyers became standardised. In the 860s, the Anglo-Saxon kingdoms of Mercia and Wessex formed a monetary alliance by which coinage of a common design could circulate through both of their lands.

During the later Anglo-Saxon period a very small number of gold coins were produced. Nine are known, including a gold penny of Ecgberht, King of Wessex, found by a metal detectorist in March 2020. King Offa of Mercia minted a gold coin based on the Islamic gold dinar, probably as part of a yearly donation to the Papacy. Coenwulf of Mercia coined a gold mancus, followed by later kings such as Edward the Elder, Ethelred II and Edward the Confessor. Archbishop Wigmund of York also issued copper stycas and a gold solidus in his own name.
