= Guthrum II =

King of the East Angles
- Reign: 10th-century
- Predecessor: Æthelwold
- Religion: Christian

Guthrum II was, according to some reconstructions, a King of East Anglia in the early 10th century.

== Background ==
East Anglian penny commemorating King Edmund, probably before 905

The only Viking ruler of the kingdom of East Anglia whose existence is beyond doubt is the earlier Guthrum. He took the baptismal name Æthelstan, and died in 890 after ruling East Anglia for around ten years.

Until the death of Guthrum, the coins of East Anglia provide an essential guide to the rulers of the kingdom. After the killing of King Æthelberht II of East Anglia in 794, only two kings—Edmund, better known as Saint Edmund the Martyr, and Guthrum—are named in near-contemporary written records, while all others are known only from the numismatic evidence provided by surviving coins. This evidence comes to an end at Guthrum's death as late East Anglian coins cease to name the king on whose orders they were minted and instead bear the name of King Edmund. From this time forward, kings are only known from the very limited written record.

It is believed that Eohric was king of East Anglia. The beginning of his reign cannot be dated. He was killed in 902 at the battle of the Holme alongside Æthelwold of Wessex, fighting against the armies of Æthelwold's cousin King Edward the Elder. The East Anglians are recorded by the Anglo-Saxon Chronicle as signing a peace with Edward in 906 and submitting to Edward late in 917, but on neither occasion are their leaders named by the Chronicle.

== The Laws of Edward and Guthrum ==
In his translation of the German historian Johann Martin Lappenberg's History of England under the Anglo-Saxon Kings, Benjamin Thorpe refers to King Guthrum II as having led the East Anglians in 906 when peace was made with Edward the Elder. Thorpe bases this upon one of his own earlier works, Ancient Laws and Institutes of England (1840). Here he printed the Laws of Edward and Guthrum, which he presumed to be a record of the agreement in 906. He referred to the medieval historian John of Wallingford as supporting this identification, stating that Wallingford referred to a second Guthrum being active in Edward's reign. Joseph Stevenson translated Wallingford some years after Thorpe wrote, and his edition disagrees with Thorpe's reading. According to Stevenson's translation, Wallingford wrote that the King Guthrum who had made peace with Alfred and whose death in 890 is not disputed, had left England for Denmark and returned again during the reign of Edward at the request of his son Æthelstan. "Here again Wallingford has fallen into error" and "These statements are to be received with caution" are Stevenson's comments.

In time the idea that the Laws of Edward and Guthrum should be dated to the reign of Edward the Elder came under scrutiny. Frederick Attenborough's Laws of the Earliest English Kings (1921) discussed them and referred to the work of German historian Felix Liebermann. Liebermann considered the preamble to the laws to be inauthentic and dated them to the reign of King Æthelstan. Modern studies date them to later yet. The late Patrick Wormald wrote: "From 1568 to 1941, no one seems to have doubted that [the Laws of Edward and Guthrum] was just what it claimed to be." But, Wormald notes, since 1941, when Dorothy Whitelock published a study of the text, this is no longer the case. Rather than being seen as a contemporary record of the peace of 906, or a document from the time of Æthelstan, the Laws are now dated to around 1000. It is believed that they were written by Wulfstan II, Archbishop of York (died 1023).

== Sources ==
- Davis, R.H.C. (1991). From Alfred the Great to Stephen. London: The Hambledon Press. ISBN 978-18528-5-045-6.
- Lappenberg, Johann Martin (1845). A History of England Under the Saxon Kings. Vol. 2. Translated by Thorpe, Benjamin. London: J. Murray. OCLC 1046585695.
