= High-reeve =

Medieval English noble title

High-reeve (Old English: hēahgerēfa) was a title taken by some English magnates during the 10th and 11th centuries, and is particularly associated with the rulers of Bamburgh. It was not however only used by rulers of Bamburgh; many other places used the title; e.g. there was an Ordulf "High-Reeve of Dumnonia".

The first reference to a high-reeve was perhaps in the third code of Edmund I of England, where there is an official known as a summus praepositus. Alfred Smyth thought heah-gerefa was influenced by the Scottish word mormaer, the meaning of which, supposedly great steward, is possibly similar.

In the North People's Law, a high-reeve is given a wergild of four thousand thrymsas, the same as a hold and half the wergild of an ealdorman. Ann Williams believes that the High-Reeve was originally an urban official whose job was to deputise for an ealdorman, but unlike other such figures could lead provincial armies.

== Hogrefe ==
Hogrefe (Low Saxon hoghe greve, younger forms Hogrebe, Hogrefe, Hogreve, and Hogrewe, also as modern surnames) was a title and function taken by judges presiding over a so-called Gogericht, which was part of the local jurisdiction mainly in the formerly Saxon areas in Westphalia and Lower Saxony in Northern Germany. In 1164, a preliminary form of Hogrefe appears first in a document of Medebach. The title remained in use until the 17th century mainly in parts of Electoral Hanover, today's State of Lower Saxony.

== See also ==
- Reeve
