= Guthrum (disambiguation) =

The Anglo-Saxon name Guthrum corresponds to Norwegian Guttom and to Danish Gorm.

The name Guthrum may refer to these kings:

- Guthrum (died c. 890), later King Æthelstan, who fought against Alfred the Great
- Gorm the Old (died c. 958) of Denmark and Norway
- Guthrum II, a 10th-century king of dubious existence
- Guttorm of Norway (1199–1204), King of Norway
