= Weregild =

Paid in atonement for blood guilt

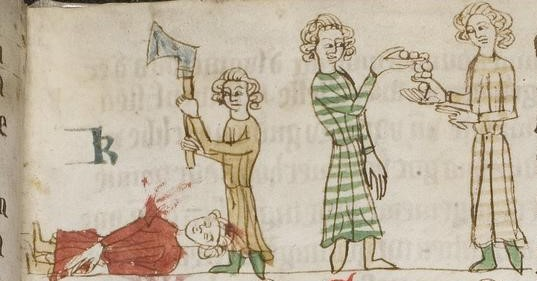
Image of a murder by a minor and the subsequent paying of wergild, in Heidelberger Sachsenspiegel Cgm 165 fol. 11r. This is one of the only images of wergild payment from the Middle Ages.

Weregild (also spelled wergild, wergeld (in archaic/historical usage of English), weregeld, etc.), also known as man price (blood money), was a tradition in Germanic law whereby a monetary value was established for a person's life, to be paid as a fine or as compensatory damages to the person's family if that person was killed or injured by another.

== Etymology and terminology ==
The compound noun weregild means "remuneration for a man", from Proto-Germanic *wira- "man, human" and *geld-a- "retaliation, remuneration". In the southern Germanic areas, this is the most common term used to mean "payment for killing a man" (Old High German werigelt, Langobardic wergelt, Old English wer(e)gild), whereas in the North Germanic areas the more common term is Old Norse mangæld, with the same meaning. Wolfgang Haubrichs argues that wergild is "undoubtably a West Germanic word" which spread throughout the various Germanic-speaking peoples, but which in the north was replaced with mangæld since the meaning of the element "wer-" had been forgotten; comparable replacement words such as wider-geld ("repayment") are known from the south.

Several alternative terms are also found, such as leodis ("man") and leodardi ("violation of a man") in the Lex Salica, and the short form wer(e) in Old English. Both of these terms appear to derive from a word referring to the subject harmed, with a shift to meaning to refer to the payment for that harm.

== Overview ==
A weregild, or wergeld, was a defined value placed on every man graded according to rank, used as a basis of a fine or compensation for murder, disablement, injury, and certain other serious crimes against that person. It was assessed from the guilty party, payable as restitution to the victim's family.

The weregild was codified, for example, under Frankish Salic Code.

Weregild payment was an important legal mechanism in early Germanic society; the other common form of legal reparation at this time was blood revenge. The payment was typically made to the family or to the clan. Similar to the way a payment was made to family, it was also a family's or kin group's responsibility to ensure the payment for the wrong committed, especially if the offender is unable to cover the cost of the offense himself.

No distinction was made between murder and manslaughter until these distinctions were instituted by the re-introduction of Roman law in the 12th century.

Payment of the weregild was gradually replaced with capital punishment due to Christianization, starting around the 9th century, and almost entirely by the 12th century when weregild began to cease as a practice throughout the Holy Roman Empire.

Weregild from Norðleoda Laga:

Rank	Thrymsa
King	30,000
Archbishop/aetheling	15,000
Bishop/ealdorman	8,000
Hold/high-reeve	4,000
Mass-thegn/secular thegn	2,000
Prospering ceorl	2,000
Ceorl	200
Prospering Welshman	360 (120s)
Non-prospering Welshman	240 (80s)
Landless Welshman	210 (70s)

Welsh weregilds were given in shillings, which can be translated at the standard late Anglo-Saxon exchange rate of 1 shilling = 3 thrymsas = 12 pence.

== Origins ==
Wergild first appears in the European historical record in 500 AD in the Lex Burgundionum, but the concept of paying blood-money is found widely in many pre-modern societies. Scholars debate if wergild was a traditional Germanic legal concept, or if it developed from a Roman predecessor. Christophe Gamby argued in 2013 that the entire institution was essentially derived from Roman law, whereas Harald Siems and Ralph Mathisen both rejected this concept in 2021, arguing that nothing comparable existed in Roman Law. However, Siems and Mathisen both argue that Roman law still influenced the definitions of crimes and possibly legal procedures in the "barbarian law codes" that first mention wergild.

== Amount ==
The size of the weregild was largely conditional upon the social rank of the victim. There used to be something of a "basis" fee for a standard "free man" that could then be multiplied according to the social rank of the victim and the circumstances of the crime. The weregild for women relative to that of men of equal rank varied: among the Saxons half that of men.

In the Migration period, the standard weregild for a freeman appears to have been 200 solidi (shillings), an amount reflected as the basic fee due for the death of a churl (or ceorl) both in later Anglo-Saxon and continental law codes.

In the 8th century, the Lex Alamannorum sets the weregild for a duke or archbishop at three times the basic fee (600 shillings), while the killing of a low ranking cleric was fined with 300, raised to 400 if the cleric was attacked while he was reading mass.

During the reign of Charlemagne, his missi dominici required three times the regular weregild for those killed whilst on a mission from the king.

In 9th century Mercian law a regular freeman (churl) was worth 200 shillings (twyhyndeman), and a nobleman was worth 1,200 (twelfhyndeman), a division established enough that two centuries later a charter of King Cnut's would simply refer to "all his people—the twelve-hundreders and the two-hundreders". The law code even mentions the weregild for a king, at 30,000 thrymsas (10,000 shillings at the standard rate of 4 pence per thrymsa), composed of 15,000 for the man, paid to the royal family, and 15,000 for the kingship, paid to the people. An archbishop or nobleman is likewise valued at 15,000 thrymsas. The weregild for a Welshman was 120 shillings if he owned at least one hide of land and was able to pay the king's tribute. If he has only 1 hide and cannot pay the tribute, his wergild was 80 shillings, and then 70 if he was landless yet free.

Thralls and slaves legally commanded no weregild, but it was commonplace to make a nominal payment in the case of a thrall and the value of the slave in such a case. Technically this amount cannot be called a weregild, because it was more akin to a reimbursement to the owner for lost or damaged property.

== In literature ==
A classic example of a dispute over the weregild of a slave is contained in Iceland's Egil's Saga.

In the Völsunga saga or Saga of the Volsungs, the Æsir (Odin, Loki and Hœnir) are asked to pay weregild for killing Otr, son of Hreidmar. Otr is a "great fisherman" and resembles an otter. He is 'eating a salmon and half dozing' on the river banks of Andvari's Falls when Loki kills him by throwing a stone at him. Later that evening, the Æsir visit Hreidmar's house where they are seized and imposed with a fine. Their fine consists of "filling the [Otr] skin with gold and covering the outside with red gold." Loki is sent to get the gold and he manages to trick the dwarf Andvari into giving him the gold as well as a cursed ring: "The dwarf went into the rock and said that the gold ring would be the death of whoever owned it, and the same applied to all the gold."

In the Story of Grettir the Strong, chapter 27, "The Suit for the Slaying of Thorgils Makson", Thorgeir conveys to court Thorgils Arison's offer of weregild as atonement for killing Thorgils Makson.

In the Old English epic poem Beowulf, lines 156–158 Grendel refuses to settle his killings with payment or recompense, and at lines 456–472, Hroðgar recalls the story of how Ecgþeow (Beowulf's father) once came to him for help, for he had slain Heaðolaf, a man from another tribe called the Wulfings, and either could not pay the wergild or they refused to accept it. Hroðgar had married Wealhþeow, who probably belonged to the Wulfing tribe, and was able to use his kinship ties to persuade the Wulfings to accept the wergild and end the feud. Hroðgar sees Beowulf's offer as a son's gratitude for what Hroðgar had done for Beowulf's father.

== See also ==
- Anglo-Saxon law

International:

- Diyya, Islamic
- Éraic, Irish
- Galanas, Welsh
- Główszczyzna, Polish

General:

- Value of life
- Wrongful death

== Sources ==
- Byock, Jesse L. (1990) Saga of the Volsungs. University of California Press. ISBN 0140447385.
- Esders, Stefan (2021). "Chapter 1 Wergild and the Monetary Logic of Early Medieval Conflict Resolution". In Bothe, Lukas; Esders, Stefan; Nijdam, Han (eds.). Wergeld, Compensation and Penance: The Monetary Logic of Early Medieval Conflict Resolution. pp. 1–37. doi:10.1163/9789004466128_002.
- Haubrichs, Wolfgang (2021). "Chapter 4 Wergeld: The Germanic Terminology of Compositio and Its Implementation in the Early Middle Ages". In Bothe, Lukas; Esders, Stefan; Nijdam, Han (eds.). Wergeld, Compensation and Penance: The Monetary Logic of Early Medieval Conflict Resolution. pp. 92–112. doi:10.1163/9789004466128_005.
- Rabin, Andrew, The Political Writings of Archbishop Wulfstan of York (Manchester, 2015).
- Schmidt-Wiegand, Ruth (2010e) [2006]. "Wergeld". Germanische Altertumskunde Online.
