= Battle of the Holme =

Battle between Kent and East Anglian Danes in 902

Coordinates: 52°28′33″N 0°14′33″W

Holme
- Part of Æthelwold's Revolt
Date	Probably 13 December 902
Location	Possibly Holme, Huntingdonshire
Result	Viking victory; Æthelwold died; End of Æthelwold's Revolt

Belligerents
East Anglia	Kent

Commanders and leaders
Æthelwold ætheling †; King Eohric †; Brihtsige †; Ysopa hold †; Oscytel hold †	Ealdoeman Sigewulf †; Ealdorman Sigehelm †; Abbot Cenwulf †; Sigeberth †; Eadwold †

Strength
Unknown	Unknown

Casualties and losses
Unknown	Unknown

The Battle of the Holme took place in East Anglia probably on 13 December 902 where the Anglo-Saxon men of Kent fought against the East Anglian Danes. Its location is unknown but may have been Holme in Huntingdonshire (now administratively part of Cambridgeshire) or the medieval location known as 'Holm' in St. Clements Parish Cambridge.

Following the death of Alfred the Great in 899, his son Edward the Elder became king, but his cousin Æthelwold, the son of Alfred's elder brother, King Æthelred, claimed the throne. His bid was unsuccessful, and he fled to the Northumbrian Danes, who, according to one version of the Anglo-Saxon Chronicle, accepted him as king. In 902 Æthelwold came with a fleet to Essex and the following year he persuaded the East Anglian Danes to attack Mercia and north Wessex. Edward retaliated by ravaging East Anglia and the Danish army was forced to return to defend its own territory. Edward then retreated, but the men of Kent disobeyed the order to retire, and they met the Danes at the battle of the Holme.

The course of the battle is unknown, but the Danes appear to have won as according to the Anglo-Saxon Chronicle they "kept the place of slaughter". However, they suffered heavy losses including Æthelwold, Eohric, probably the Danish king of East Anglia, Brihtsige, son of the ætheling Beornoth, and two holds, Ysopa and Oscetel. The battle thus ended Æthelwold's Revolt. Kentish losses included Sigehelm, father of Edward the Elder's third wife, Eadgifu of Kent. The West Saxon chronicler who gave the fullest account of the battle was at pains to explain why Edward and the rest of the English were not present, as if this had been a subject of criticism.

The date of the battle is not certain. The late tenth-century chronicler Æthelweard stated that it took place "five days after the feast of the Holy Mother" in 902, and the historian W. T. Wainwright argued that this refers to the Feast of the Immaculate Conception on 8 December, dating the battle to 13 December, although he admitted that the identification is not certain as this feast was not widely celebrated until the early eleventh century and Æthelweard was writing in the late tenth. Sean Miller accepts the date of 13 December 902, but there are other feasts which could be described as that of the Holy Mother. Most historians, including Simon Keynes and Michael Lapidge, give the date as 902, but some, such as Ann Williams, show it as 903. Cyril Hart thinks it unlikely that the battle took place so late in the year as that would mean that Æthelwold invaded Mercia and Wessex in the autumn; he thinks the spring of 903 is more probable.

== Sources ==
- Campbell, Alistair, ed. (1962). The Chronicle of Æthelweard. London, UK: Thomas Nelson and Son Ltd. OCLC 245905467.
- Campbell, James (2001). "What is not known about the reign of Edward the Elder". In Higham, N. J.; Hill, D. H. (eds.). Edward the Elder 899–924. Routledge. pp. 12–24. ISBN 0-415-21497-1.
- Deakin, Mick (2026). "The Location of the Battle of The Holme". Battalia. IV. The Battlefields Trust: 1–10. ISSN 2516-0451.
- Hart, Cyril (1992). The Danelaw. London, UK: The Hambledon Press. ISBN 978-1-85285-044-9.
- Keynes, Simon; Lapidge, Michael, eds. (1983). Alfred the Great: Asser's Life of King Alfred and Other Contemporary Sources. London, UK: Penguin Classics. ISBN 978-0-14-044409-4.
- Keynes, Simon (1999). "England, c. 900–1016". In Reuter, Timothy (ed.). The New Cambridge Medieval History. Vol. III. Cambridge, UK: Cambridge University Press. pp. 456–484. ISBN 978-0-521-36447-8.
- Miller, Sean (2011). "Edward (called Edward the Elder) (870s?–924), King of the Anglo-Saxons". Oxford Dictionary of National Biography. Oxford University Press. doi:10.1093/ref:odnb/8514. (subscription, Wikipedia Library access or UK public library membership required)
- Stafford, Pauline (2004). "Eadgifu (b. in or before 904, d. in or after 966), queen of the Anglo-Saxons, consort of Edward the Elder". Oxford Dictionary of National Biography. Oxford University Press. doi:10.1093/ref:odnb/52307. (subscription, Wikipedia Library access or UK public library membership required)
- Stenton, Frank M. (1971). Anglo-Saxon England. Oxford: Clarendon Press. ISBN 978-0-19-280139-5.
- Wainwright, F. T. (September 1945). "The Chronology of the 'Mercian Register'". English Historical Review. 60 (238): 385–392. ISSN 0013-8266.
- Whitelock, Dorothy; Douglas, David; Tucker, Susie, eds. (1961). The Anglo-Saxon Chronicle. London, UK: Eyre and Spottiswoode. OCLC 317315404.
- Williams, Ann (1991). "Æthelwold Ætheling d. 903". In Williams, Ann; Smyth, Alfred P.; Kirby, D. P. (eds.). A Biographical Dictionary of Dark Age Britain. London, UK: Seaby. p. 33. ISBN 978-1-85264-047-7.
