= Sceat =

Anglo-Saxon coin

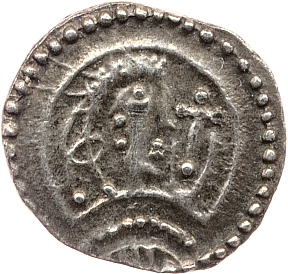
O: Diademed bust right, with cross in front

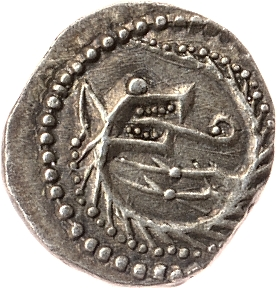
R: Coiled wolf with curled tongue facing right

Silver sceat of series K, London (?), c. 710-20.

A sceat or sceatta (/ʃæt/ SHAT; Old English: sċeatt [ʃæɑt], pl. sċeattas) was a small, thick silver coin minted in England, Frisia, and Jutland during the Anglo-Saxon period that normally weighed 0.8–1.3 grams (about 1/30 troy ounce). It is now (as of 2024) more commonly known in England as an 'early penny'.

== History ==
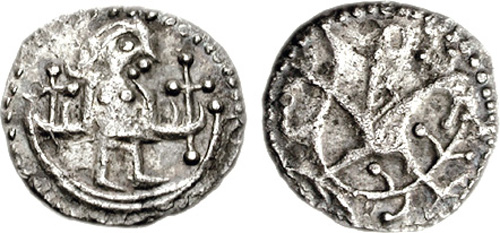
Series U sceat

Its name derives from Old English sceatt, meaning "wealth", "money", and "coin", which has been applied to these coins since the 17th century based on interpretations of the legal codes of Mercia and of Kent under its king Æthelberht. It is likely, however, that the coins were more often known to contemporaries as "pennies" (Old English: peningas), much like their successor silver coins. They are very diverse, organised into over a hundred numbered types derived from the British Museum Catalogue of the 1890s and by broader alphabetical classifications laid out by British numismatist Stuart Rigold in the 1970s.

The huge volume of finds made in the last thirty years using metal detectors has radically altered understanding of this coinage and, while it is now clear that these coins were in everyday use across eastern and southern England in the early 8th century, it is also apparent that the current organisation is in considerable need of adjustment.

== Legends ==
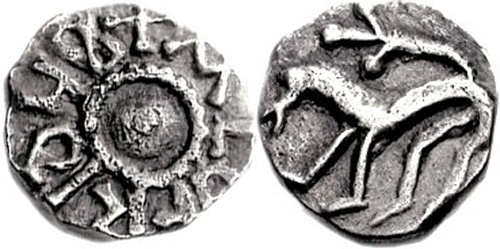

Silver sceat of Aldfrith of Northumbria, 685-704.

Sceattas rarely carry legends of any kind, though a small number do name the mint of London and others carry short runic legends such as 'Aethiliraed' and 'Efe', which probably refer to moneyers rather than kings.

== Imagery ==
Although sceattas present many problems of organisation, attribution, and dating, they also carry a variety of designs bespeaking extensive Celtic, classical, and Germanic influences. These designs include human figures, animals, birds, crosses, plants, and monsters, all of which have been elucidated by Anna Gannon. Tony Abramson has published an illustrated guide for nonexperts. One series (U), has been linked to King Aethelbald of Mercia (716-57) on the basis of its iconography, though this attribution is tenuous and recent research suggests it is very unlikely. It has also been suggested on the basis of the iconography of certain sceattas that they were issued by ecclesiastical authorities, such as bishops or abbots. Minting may not have been a strictly urban or secular prerogative, and coins were used for many payments and purposes beyond pure commercial buying and selling.

== Minting ==
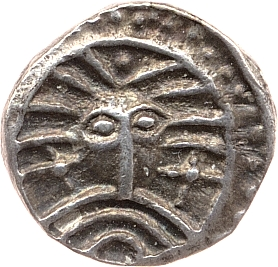
O: Facing bust with beard and cross on either side.

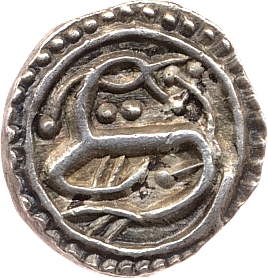
R: Right-facing curled 'dragon'.

Silver sceat of series X, Ribe, Denmark, c. 710-20.

Associating sceattas with particular mints or kingdoms is very difficult and must be based primarily upon study of find-spots. Most have been found using metal detectors since the 1970s. In this way, it has been possible to attribute some types with considerable confidence, such as series H with Wessex (and in particular Southampton) and series S with Essex. In Denmark, series X has been plausibly associated with the early trading center at Ribe.

The chronology of the sceattas is also very hard to unravel. Some of the earliest series use the same designs as the pale gold thrymsas (similar to the continental Latin: tremissis; notionally one-third of a pure gold solidus) and, by analogy with coins from the better-understood Frankish material, can be dated to the 680s. It is known that sceattas were minted in the Frisian town of Dorestad (just south of Utrecht in the Netherlands); they were a commonly circulating currency in the Frankish realm until the monetary reform of Pepin the Short instituted at Ver in 755.

The thirty or forty years after 680 saw the production and circulation of the "primary series" of sceattas, which were generally of good metal quality and weight (c. 1–1.3 grams). They were largely minted in Kent and the Thames Estuary, though a few were produced in Northumbria bearing the name of King Aldfrith (r. 685–704). The "secondary series", struck from c. 710 to c. 750, saw a massive expansion of minting all over southern and eastern England to every major Anglo-Saxon kingdom. One or more types can be attributed with more or less confidence to Wessex, Mercia, Sussex, Essex, Kent, Northumbria, and East Anglia.

There was much copying and debasement, and weight could fluctuate considerably (c. 0.8–1.3 grams). There are relatively few hoards from this period with which to construct even a relative chronology, and any new discovery could radically alter current scholarly understanding. The end of the sceattas is especially difficult to pinpoint, and it is likely that there was a period of some decades in the middle of the 8th century when very few if any coins were produced in England.

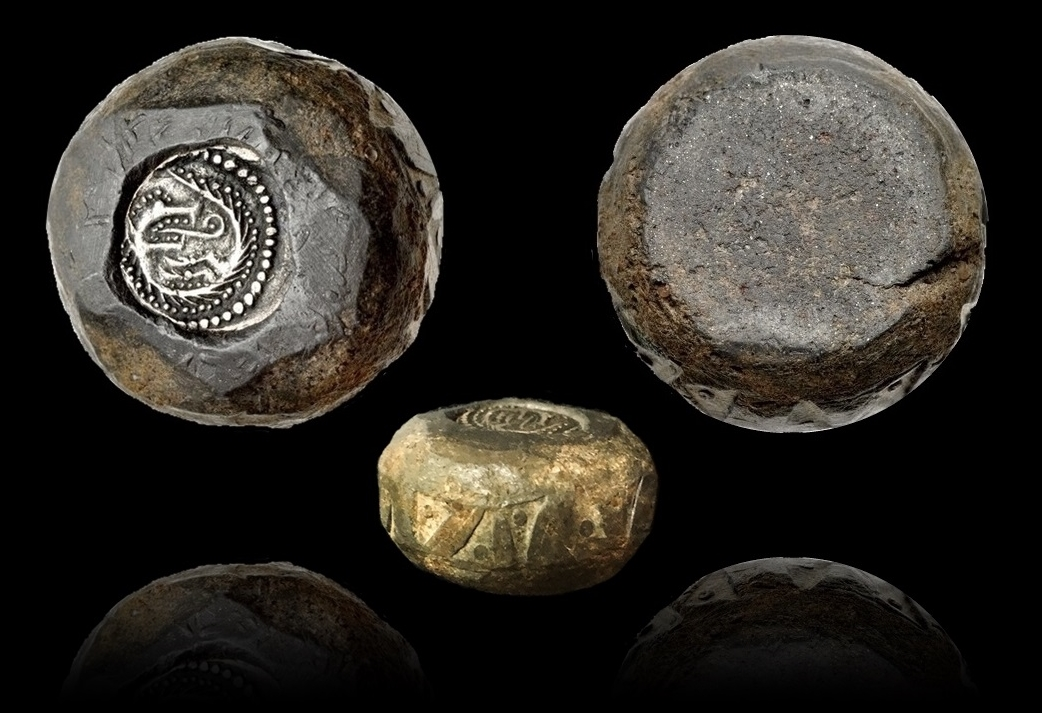
Anglo-Saxon-Viking coin weight. Used for trading bullion and hacksilver. Material is lead and weighs approx 36 g. Embedded with an Anglo-Saxon sceat (Series K type 32a) dating to 720-750 AD and minted in Kent. It is edged in dotted triangle pattern. Origin is the Danelaw region and dates AD 870-930.

== Gallery ==
Sceattas

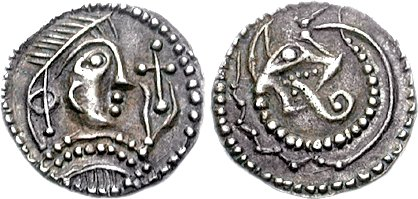
Series K sceat (Kent)

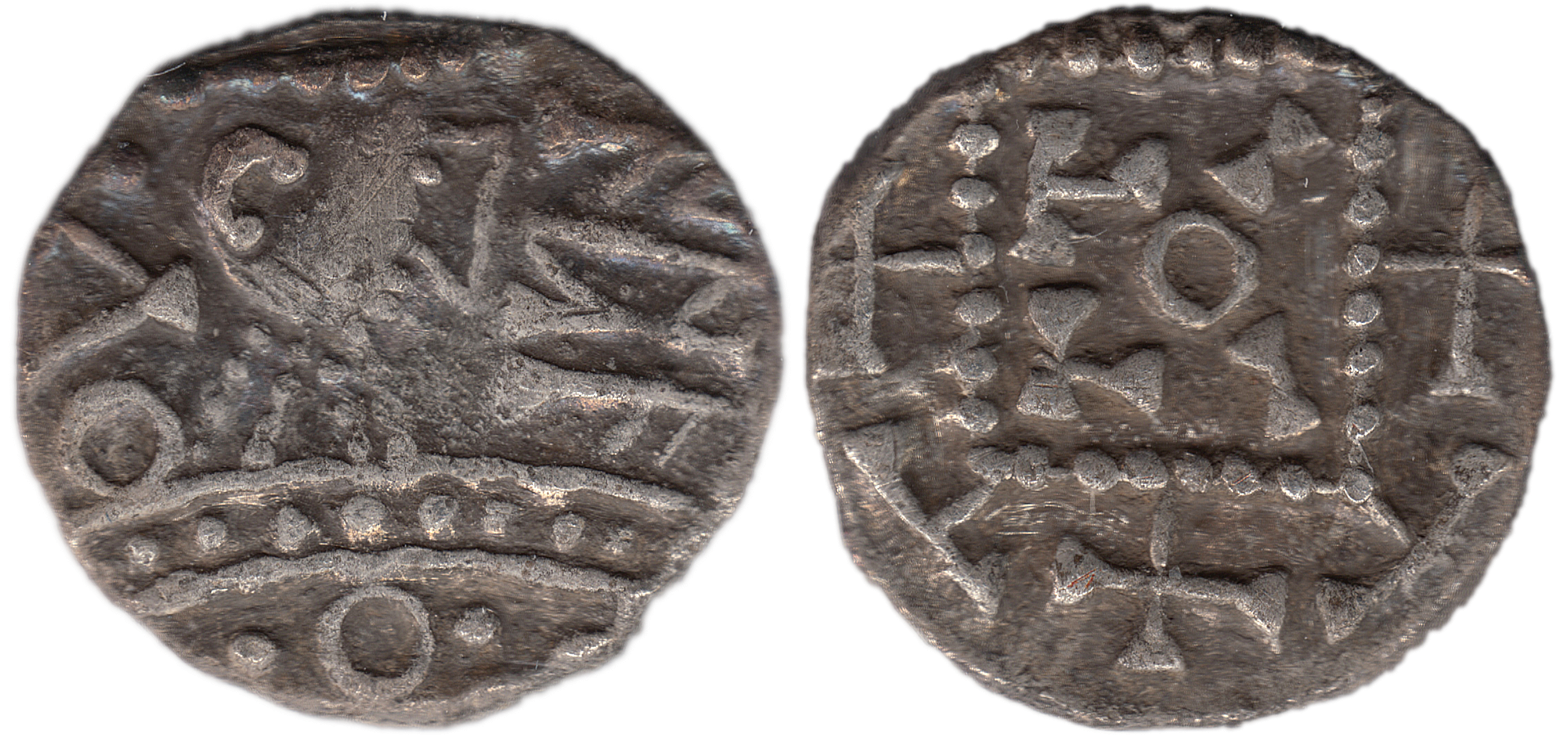
Series C sceat (East Anglia)

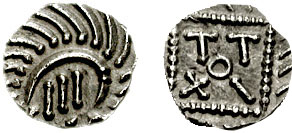
Series E, Kloster Barthe variety (Frisia)
