= Æthelwold ætheling =

Son of Æthelred I of Wessex (died 902)

England in the late ninth century

Æthelwold (/ˈæθəlwoʊld/) or Æthelwald (died probably 13 December 902) was the younger of two known sons of Æthelred I, King of Wessex from 865 to 871. Æthelwold and his brother Æthelhelm were still infants when their father the king died while fighting a Danish Viking invasion. The throne passed to the king's younger brother (Æthelwold's uncle) Alfred the Great, who carried on the war against the Vikings and won a crucial victory at the Battle of Edington in 878.

After Alfred's death in 899, Æthelwold disputed the throne with Alfred's son, Edward the Elder. As senior ætheling (prince of the royal dynasty eligible for kingship), Æthelwold had a strong claim to the throne. He attempted to raise an army to support his claim, but was unable to get sufficient support to meet Edward in battle and fled to Viking-controlled Northumbria, where he was accepted as king. In 901 or 902 he sailed with a fleet to Essex, where he was also accepted as king.

The following year Æthelwold persuaded the East Anglian Danes to attack Edward's territory in Wessex and Mercia. Edward retaliated with a raid on East Anglia, and when he withdrew the men of Kent lingered and met the East Anglian Danes at an unknown location in the Battle of the Holme, probably on 13 December 902. The Danes were victorious but suffered heavy losses, including the death of Æthelwold, which ended the challenge to Edward's rule.

== Background ==
In the eighth century, Mercia was the most powerful kingdom in southern England, but in the early ninth century Wessex became dominant. In the 820s King Egbert of Wessex conquered south-east England (Kent, Surrey, Sussex and Essex). His reign saw the beginning of Viking attacks, but Egbert and his son Æthelwulf, who succeeded in 839, were able to resist them. Æthelwulf died in 858, and he was followed by four sons in succession. King Æthelbald died in 860, and King Æthelberht in 865; Æthelwold's father, Æthelred, then succeeded to the throne. In the same year the Viking Great Heathen Army invaded England. Within five years they had conquered Northumbria and East Anglia, and forced Mercia to buy them off. In late 870 the Vikings invaded Wessex, and in early 871 they fought armies under Æthelred and Alfred in four battles in quick succession, the last two of which Wessex lost. Æthelred died shortly after Easter that year, leaving young sons. Primogeniture was not established in this period, and it was believed that kings should be adults, so he was succeeded by his younger brother Alfred.

By 878 the Vikings had seized eastern Mercia and nearly conquered Wessex, and Alfred was reduced to being a fugitive in the Somerset marshes, but he fought back and won the Battle of Edington. This was followed by a period of peace, and in the late 880s Alfred concluded a treaty with Guthrum, king of the East Anglian Vikings, setting the boundary between Wessex and English Mercia on the one hand, and the Danelaw on the other. Further Viking assaults in the mid 890s were unsuccessful.

== Early life ==
Very little is known of Æthelwold's immediate family. His father, Æthelred, was born in about 848 (Note: According to Sean Miller, Æthelred was perhaps a year or so older than Alfred, who was born in 849.) and died in 871, so his sons must have been young children when he died. Æthelred's wife was probably the Wulfthryth who witnessed a charter as regina in 868. Æthelwold and his older brother Æthelhelm are first recorded in King Alfred's will in the 880s. Æthelhelm is not heard of again, and he probably died soon afterwards. (Note: Æthelwold is often described as Æthelred's elder son, but according to Barbara Yorke his brother Æthelhelm was the elder. Æthelhelm is listed above Æthelwold in Alfred's will. Æthelwold may have had another older brother called Oswald (or Osweald), who witnessed charters as filius regis (a king's son) in 868 and 875.) The only other record of Æthelwold before Alfred's death is as a witness to a charter that probably dates to the 890s.

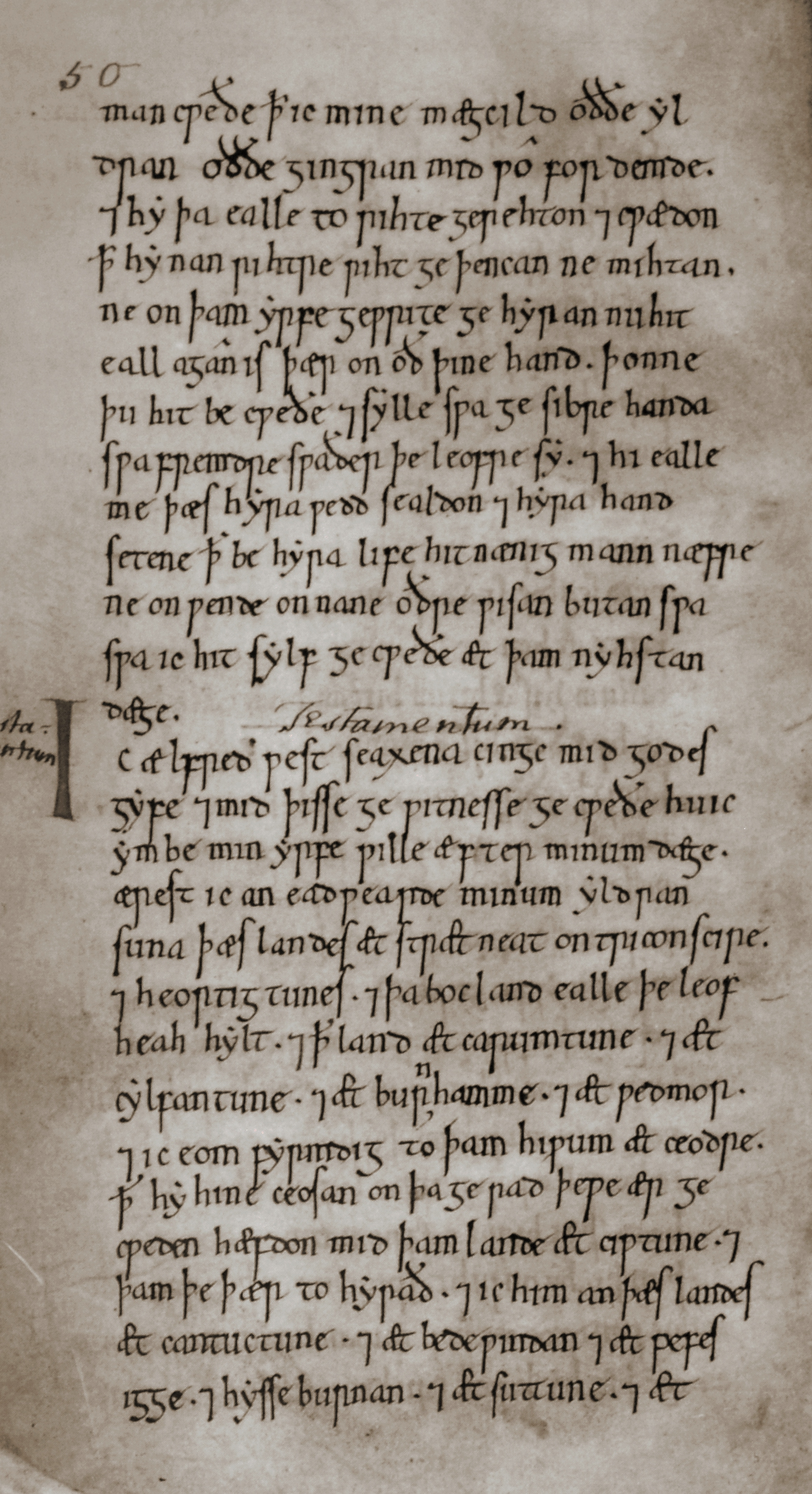
Page from the will of Alfred the Great. The top part, above the 'I', is the end of the preamble describing his councillors' support against his nephews at Langandene. The will itself starts below the 'I'.

After King Æthelred's death in 871, his sons' supporters complained about Alfred keeping property that should have belonged to his nephews. Alfred justified his conduct in a preamble to his will, which probably dates to the 880s. (Note: Alfred had made an earlier will, and it is possible that the preamble was retained from the earlier one.) One of Alfred's biographers, Richard Abels, describes the text as "rather tendentious", and another, Alfred P. Smyth, as "ambiguous and vague – and deliberately so". Patrick Wormald views the will as "one of the seminal documents of pre-Conquest history, and like many such not easily understood."

The dispute concerned property bequeathed in the will of Alfred's father, Æthelwulf. This does not survive, but Alfred described some of its provisions in a preamble to his own will. Æthelwulf had left property jointly to three of his four surviving sons, Æthelbald, Æthelred and Alfred, stipulating that all of it was to be inherited by the brother who lived the longest. When Æthelred inherited the throne in 865, Alfred asked for the property to be divided between them. Æthelred refused, offering instead to leave it to Alfred on his death, together with any further property he acquired, and Alfred agreed. The Viking invasion of Wessex, and the need to provide for their children, led to a revision of the terms. Under an agreement in late 870 or early 871, the survivor was still to keep the property bequeathed jointly to the three brothers, but he would give his brother's children any lands which he had received separately from his father, and any he had acquired later.

In the preamble to his will, Alfred stated:

When we now heard many disputes about the inheritance, I brought King Æthelwulf's will to our assembly at Langandene, (Note: It is not known where Langandene is. It may be in Devon.) and it was read before all the councillors of the West Saxons. When it had been read, I urged them all for love of me – and gave them my pledge that I would never bear a grudge against any one of them because they declared what was right – that none of them would hesitate, either for love or fear of me, to expound the common law, lest any man should say that I had treated my young kinsmen wrongfully, the older or the younger. And then they all pronounced what was right, and said that they could not conceive any juster title, nor could they find one in the will. "Now everything has come into your possession, and you may bequeath it or give it into the hand of kinsman or stranger, whichever you prefer."

Historians have taken differing views of Æthelwulf's will. The historians Simon Keynes and Michael Lapidge suggest that Æthelwulf's other surviving son, (Note: Æthelwulf had five sons, but the eldest, Æthelstan, had already died when Æthelwulf drew up his will.) Æthelberht, was excluded from the arrangement because he was provided for separately in the eastern kingdom (the recently conquered south-east England), where he acted as king in 855 and 856; it was probably intended that he should establish a separate dynasty there. The bequest to the three brothers would only have covered part of Æthelwulf's property. The transmission of folkland was governed by customary law, and another portion was reserved for the holder of the office of king. Keynes and Lapidge argue that Æthelwulf clearly intended that his personal property should be preserved intact, and it seems to have been considered desirable that this should be held by the reigning king, so it is likely that he intended the kingship of western Wessex to be inherited by the survivor of the three brothers. This plan was abandoned when Æthelbald died in 860 and the kingdom was reunited under Æthelberht, and Æthelred's confirmation of the arrangement when he acceded in 865 recognised Alfred as heir apparent.

Ann Williams comments: "Æthelred virtually disinherits his children in favour of Alfred's in the event of his own previous death, at least in respect of the lion's share of the inheritance and therefore the kingship. This is in fact exactly what happened, and Æthelred's sons were not pleased at the outcome." In his Life of Alfred, written in 893, Asser states three times that Alfred was Æthelred's secundarius (heir apparent), an emphasis that in Ryan Lavelle's view "reflects sensitivity on the subject of Alfred's succession".

Smyth argues, however, that it is unlikely that Æthelwulf intended to divide his kingdom, or that the kingship of Wessex should be inherited by the surviving brother; the joint property was probably provision for his youngest sons at a time when they appeared very unlikely to succeed to the kingship, with Æthelbald included as a residual beneficiary in case both of them died young. D. P. Kirby argues that it cannot be assumed that the disputed lands represented the greater part of the royal estates; he believes that Æthelwulf did intend to divide his kingdom, but also that it is unlikely he intended the surviving son to inherit the kingship: "Such an arrangement would have led to fratricidal strife. With three older brothers, Alfred's chances of reaching adulthood would, one feels, have been minimal."

In his own will, Alfred left the bulk of his property to Edward, while Æthelhelm was left eight estates, and Æthelwold only three (at Godalming and Guildford in Surrey, and Steyning in Sussex), all in the less important eastern part of the kingdom. The largest of these was Steyning, Æthelwulf's original burial place; in Patrick Wormald's view, Alfred may have moved the body to Winchester because he was required to give the estate to Æthelwold under his agreement with Æthelred, and he did not want his nephew to have the prestige of owning his grandfather's grave. Keynes and Lapidge comment: "If only to judge from the relatively small number of estates he received, Æthelwold in particular would have had cause to be aggrieved by this allocation of property, and his resentment is shown by his rebellion against Edward soon after Alfred's death." Smyth argues that the meeting of the king's council, the witan, was bound to support him:

Alfred, by [c.885] in full control of Wessex and at the height of his power, was clearly bent on trying to settle the kingship on his son, Edward, to the exclusion of his brother Æthelred's heirs. That kingship was never in Alfred's gift, but clearly the greater amount of landed wealth he could entail on Edward, the stronger he made that son's position in any future contest for the kingship. We must, therefore, treat anything he tells us of the terms of the disputed inheritance of his rival nephews with the utmost caution, if not scepticism. The support which Alfred tells us he received from the witan counts for little. As king, Alfred controlled immense patronage in relation to his thegns, who stood to benefit from backing their lord against claims which his nephews made on his property. It is significant that the case ever came before the witan at all. That it did, suggests that Æthelhelm and Æthelwold were by then young men who commanded some independent support and sympathy in Wessex.

In Abels' view, Æthelred's sons attempted to shame Alfred into handing over the lands they claimed so as to strengthen their position in the inevitable battle that would break out over the succession when Alfred died, and the Langandene assembly was Alfred's riposte. (Note: Abels and Smyth date the Langandene assembly to the mid-880s, when Æthelred's children would have been adolescents. Janet Nelson believes that it took place immediately after Alfred became king, and that Ealdorman Wulfhere, who lost his office and inheritance for deserting the king, probably in 878, may have been a maternal uncle of Alfred's nephews and a supporter of theirs at Langandene. Barbara Yorke suggests that when Alfred was at the lowest point in his fortunes Wulfhere may have negotiated with the Viking leader for his support to make Æthelhelm (Æthelred's elder son) king.)

Alfred also assisted his own son by promoting men who could be relied on to support him, and by giving him opportunities for command in battle once he was old enough. In the view of Barbara Yorke, the compilation of the Anglo-Saxon Chronicle, which magnified Alfred's achievements, may have been partly intended to strengthen the case for the succession of his own descendants. However, Yorke also argues that Æthelwold's position was not fatally undermined by Alfred's will. His mother had witnessed a charter as regina, whereas Alfred followed West Saxon tradition in refusing to have his wife consecrated as queen, and Æthelwold's status as the son of a queen may have given him an advantage over Edward. Æthelwold was still the senior ætheling, and the only surviving charter he witnessed shows both him and Edward as filius regis (son of a king), but lists Æthelwold above Edward, implying that he ranked above him.

== Æthelwold's Revolt ==
After Alfred's death in 899, Æthelwold made a bid for the throne. Janet Nelson comments that "in the eyes of many Englishmen as well as Scandinavians this ætheling had claims stronger than Edward's own." According to the 'A' version of the Anglo-Saxon Chronicle, Æthelwold abducted a nun from her convent without the permission of King Edward and against the command of the bishop. Her identity is not known, (Note: The twelfth-century chronicler John of Worcester stated that she was a nun of Wimborne. Alex Woolf suggests she may have been Alfred's daughter Æthelgifu, abbess of Shaftesbury, but Ryan Lavelle thinks it unlikely that Æthelwold's route would have taken him through Shaftesbury.) but it must have been intended to strengthen his claim, and in the view of the historian Pauline Stafford, the Chronicle's account is biased in favour of Edward and might have been intended to delegitimise a politically important marriage. Æthelwold took her to the royal manors of Twynham (now Christchurch) and then Wimborne Minster, (Note: Wimborne Minster may have been suppressed as a result of its association with Æthelwold's lineage.) symbolically important as his father's burial place, and declared that "he would live or die there". Lavelle sees Wimborne as strategically significant, close to Roman roads to Dorchester and Salisbury, and at a crossing point of the rivers Allen and Stour; it was the southernmost point for control of access to western Wessex and Æthelwold may have intended a division of the kingdom.

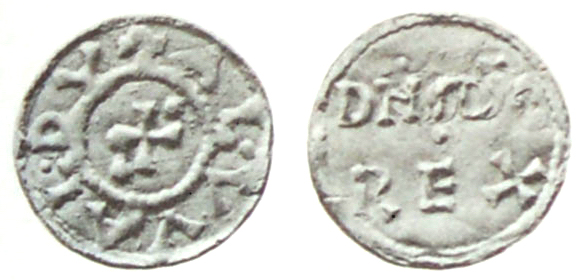
Coin of "Alwaldus" (Æthelwold)

However, when Edward's army approached and camped at Badbury Rings, an Iron Age hill fort four miles west of Wimborne, Æthelwold was unable to gain sufficient support to meet them in battle. Leaving behind his consort, he fled to the Danes of Northumbria, who accepted him as king. Northumbrian coins were issued at this time in the name of a king called 'Alwaldus', who is thought to have been Æthelwold. (Note: Frank Stenton regarded Æthelwold's acceptance as king of the Northumbrian Danes as unlikely, and the identification of the Northumbrian coins with Æthelwold as unsafe, but the view that he was accepted as Northumbrian king has been supported by Keynes and Lapidge, and the coin identification by the numismatist C. E. Blunt.) Norse sagas record traditions of a Danish king Knútr, who briefly ruled Northumbria around 900. He is said to have been at first repulsed by an English king called Adalbrigt north of Cleveland, but then to have defeated him at Scarborough. In 1987, Smyth suggested that Adalbrigt could have been Æthelwold, but in 1995 Smyth put forward the alternative idea that the Northumbrian Danes accepted Æthelwold's claim to be king of the West Saxons rather than taking him as their own king.

Æthelwold's reign in Northumbria was short, in David Rollason's view because Æthelwold saw it only as a base for gaining power in Wessex. In 901 or 902 he sailed with a fleet to Essex, where Rollason states that he was accepted as king by the local Vikings. However, David Dumville points out that in the next year Æthelwold persuaded the Danes in East Anglia to wage war against Edward, and Dumville argues that it is unlikely that there was an unknown separate Viking army in Essex. In his view Æthelwold was aiming to secure recognition in part of the kingdom of Wessex in order to strengthen his claim to the throne, and he succeeded in gaining the submission of the English rulers of Essex.

The East Anglian Danes joined Æthelwold in a raid on Mercia, reaching as far as the fortified burh at Cricklade on the border with Wessex. He then crossed the Thames into Wessex itself to raid Braydon. Edward retaliated by ravaging Danish East Anglia, but he withdrew without engaging Æthelwold in battle. The men of Kent lingered, although according to the Anglo-Saxon Chronicle Edward sent seven messengers to recall them. The Danes caught up with the men of Kent to fight the Battle of the Holme. Its location is unknown but may be Holme in Cambridgeshire. The Danes were victorious but suffered heavy losses. Æthelwold was among the leaders on the Danish side who were killed, together with Eohric, the Viking king of East Anglia, two holds (Danish noblemen), Ysopa and Oscetel, and Beorhtsige, son of the ætheling Beornoth, who was probably a kinsman of the former king of Mercia, Burgred. Kentish losses included their two ealdormen, Sigewulf and Sigehelm, and an Abbot Cenwulf.

The achievement of the Kentish contingent put Edward's failure to engage the Danes with his whole army in a poor light. In Cyril Hart's view: "Undoubtedly there were recriminations, which appear to have continued to threaten Edward's authority for some considerable period, especially in Kent; witness the Wessex chronicler's anxiety to find excuses for Edward's failure to support the Kentish contingent." Edward was later to marry Sigehelm's daughter, Eadgifu, and Hart thinks that this may have been designed to placate his Kentish subjects.

The various texts of the Anglo-Saxon Chronicle give different versions of the revolt. Hart states: "The oldest and more authoritative is preserved in the 'B' text of the Anglo-Saxon Chronicle (supported in its essentials by the Latin East Anglian Chronicle); the official version in the 'A' text is clearly a late revision, intended to justify King Edward's position and to reinforce his authority." 'B' describes Æthelwold as an ætheling, indicating the legitimacy of his claim for the kingship, a description omitted in 'A'. 'A' says that he took possession of Wimborne and Twinham without the permission of the king and his councillors, 'B' against their will. 'B' says that Æthelwold "rode away by night" from Wimborne; 'A' reads "stole away". According to 'B', the Northumbrian Danes accepted Æthelwold as their king, and gave allegiance to him, but this is omitted in 'A'. However, none of the texts describe him as an ætheling after his flight to Northumbria, showing that his actions were no longer thought to have a claim to legitimacy. In the view of Scott Thompson Smith, the dispute was over property as well as kingship, and the Chronicle presents Edward as the successful protector of family property against outside interests.

The date of the battle is not certain. The late tenth-century chronicler Æthelweard stated that it took place "five days after the feast of the Holy Mother" in 902, and the historian W. T. Wainwright argued that this refers to the Feast of the Immaculate Conception on 8 December, dating the battle to 13 December, although he admitted that the identification is not certain as this feast was not widely celebrated until the early eleventh century and Æthelweard was writing in the late tenth. Sean Miller accepts the date of 13 December 902, but there are other feasts which could be described as that of the Holy Mother. Most historians, including Simon Keynes and Michael Lapidge, give the date as 902, but some, such as Ann Williams, show it as 903. Cyril Hart thinks it unlikely that the battle took place so late in the year as that would mean he invaded Mercia and Wessex in the autumn; he thinks the spring of 903 is more probable.

== Legacy ==
According to the historian Martin Ryan:

What is striking about Æthelwold's "rebellion" is the level and range of support he was able to draw on: he could call on allies from Wessex, Northumbria, East Anglia and, probably, Mercia and Essex. For a time Æthelwold had a claim to be the most powerful ruler in England. Edward's apparent reluctance to engage him in battle may have been well founded.

In the view of James Campbell, the bias in the sources has led historians to see Æthelwold's rebellion as a "somewhat odd episode", but he had a justifiable claim to the kingship, and he was nearly successful; if he had not been killed at the Holme, he might have united England with much less warfare than ultimately proved to be necessary. "Had it not been for the chances of battle and war Æthelwold might very well have been regarded as one of the greatest figures in our island's story". Lavelle argues that "it is important to acknowledge the audacity of Æthelwold's actions" and that he "well deserves to be ranked amongst the 'Nearly Men' of early Medieval Europe". The twelfth-century Annals of St Neots called him "king of the pagans".

It is not known whether he had any descendants, but the chronicler Æthelweard was a great-great-grandson of King Æthelred, and this may have been through Æthelwold. Shashi Jayakumar suggests the rivalry between King Eadwig and his younger brother Edgar in the 950s dates back to the conflict which resulted in the Battle of the Holme. Eadwig's wife, Ælfgifu, was probably Æthelweard's sister, and one of Eadwig's supporters, Byrhtnoth, may have been descended from the Mercian royal family through the ætheling Beorhtnoth, whose son Byrhtsige died fighting on Æthelwold's side at the Holme. Opponents of Eadwig included his grandmother, Eadgifu, and Eadwig confiscated her property. In Jayakumar's view: "The emergence of Ælfgifu, descendant of the ætheling Æthelwold, did not just threaten Edgar's position, it represented a revanche to a line and lineage with royal claims of its own ... The ancestors of Byrhtnoth and Æthelweard had in all likelihood fought together with Æthelwold on the Danish side at the Battle of the Holme, the opposite side to that which Eadgifu's father Sigehelm had fought for." The marriage between Eadwig and Ælfgifu was dissolved on the grounds of consanguinity, and Edgar succeeded to the throne when Eadwig died without leaving children. In the view of Nick Higham, Æthelweard shows a "lack of empathy" for Edward in his chronicle, which Higham attributes to Edward's victory over Æthelweard's ancestor. Æthelweard was Ealdorman of the Western Provinces in the late tenth century, showing that Æthelred's descendants held on to land and power in the century after his death. Æthelweard's grandson, Æthelnoth, was an eleventh-century archbishop of Canterbury.

== Sources ==
- "Æthelwald 35 (Male) Ætheling, cousin of Edward 2, d.902". Prosopography of Anglo-Saxon England (PASE). Archived from the original on 4 January 2014.
- Abels, Richard (1988). Lordship and Military Obligation in Anglo-Saxon England. Berkeley, USA: University of California Press. ISBN 0-520-05794-5.
- Abels, Richard (1998). Alfred the Great: War, Kingship and Culture in Anglo-Saxon England. Harlow, UK: Longman. ISBN 0-582-04047-7.
- Abels, Richard (2002). "Royal Succession and the Growth of Political Stability in Ninth-Century Wessex". The Haskins Society Journal: Studies in Medieval History. 12. Boydell & Brewer. ISBN 1-84383-008-6.
- Blunt, C. E. (1985). "Northumbrian Coins in the Name of Alwaldus" (PDF). British Numismatic Journal (55). British Numismatic Society: 192–4. ISSN 0143-8956., cited in British and Irish Archaeological Bibliography
- Campbell, Alistair, ed. (1962). The Chronicle of Æthelweard. London, UK: Thomas Nelson and Son Ltd. OCLC 245905467.
- Campbell, James (2001). "What is Not Known about the reign of Edward the Elder". In Higham, N. J.; Hill, D. H. (eds.). Edward the Elder 899–924. Abingdon, UK: Routledge. ISBN 0-415-21497-1.
- Deakin, Mick (2026). "The Location of the Battle of The Holme". Battalia. IV. The Battlefields Trust: 1–10. ISSN 2516-0451.
- Dumville, David (1979). "The ætheling: a study in Anglo-Saxon constitutional history". Anglo-Saxon England. 8 (8). Cambridge University Press: 1–33. doi:10.1017/S026367510000301X. ISSN 0263-6751. S2CID 159954001.
- Dumville, David (1992). Wessex and England from Alfred to Edgar. Woodbridge, UK: The Boydell Press. ISBN 0-85115-308-9.
- Edwards, Heather (2004). "Ecgberht [Egbert] (d. 839), king of the West Saxons". Oxford Dictionary of National Biography. Oxford University Press. doi:10.1093/ref:odnb/8581. (subscription, Wikipedia Library access or UK public library membership required)
- Hart, Cyril (1992). The Danelaw. London, UK: The Hambledon Press. ISBN 1-85285-044-2.
- Higham, Nick (2001). "Edward the Elder's reputation". In Higham, N. J.; Hill, D. H. (eds.). Edward the Elder 899–924. Abingdon, UK: Routledge. ISBN 0-415-21497-1.
- Jayakumar, Shashi (2008). "Eadwig and Edgar: Politics, Propaganda, Faction". In Scragg, Donald (ed.). Edgar, King of the English, 959–975. Woodbridge, UK: The Boydell Press. ISBN 978-1-84383-928-6.
- Keynes, Simon; Lapidge, Michael, eds. (1983). Alfred the Great: Asser's Life of King Alfred and Other Contemporary Sources. London, UK: Penguin Classics. ISBN 978-0-14-044409-4.
- Kirby, D. P. (2000). The Earliest English Kings (Revised ed.). London, UK: Routledge. ISBN 0-415-24211-8.
- Lavelle, Ryan (2009). "The Politics of Rebellion: The Ætheling Æthelwold and the West Saxon Royal Succession, 899–902". In Skinner, Patricia (ed.). Challenging the Boundaries of Medieval History: The Legacy of Timothy Reuter. Turnhout, Belgium: Brepols. ISBN 978-2-503-52359-0.
- Mason, Emma (2004). "Æthelnoth (d. 1038), Archbishop of Canterbury". Oxford Dictionary of National Biography. Oxford University Press. doi:10.1093/ref:odnb/8912. (subscription, Wikipedia Library access or UK public library membership required)
- Miller, Sean (2004a). "Æthelred I [Ethelred I] (d. 871), King of the West Saxons". Oxford Dictionary of National Biography. Oxford University Press. doi:10.1093/ref:odnb/8913. (subscription, Wikipedia Library access or UK public library membership required)
- Miller, Sean (2004b). "Edward (called Edward the Elder) (870s?–924), King of the Anglo-Saxons". Oxford Dictionary of National Biography. Oxford University Press. doi:10.1093/ref:odnb/8514. (subscription, Wikipedia Library access or UK public library membership required)
- Nelson, Janet L. (1986). "'A King Across the Sea: Alfred in Continental Perspective". Transactions of the Royal Historical Society. 5th. 36. Cambridge University Press: 45–68. doi:10.2307/3679059. ISSN 0080-4401. JSTOR 3679059. S2CID 159863670.
- Nelson, Janet L. (2004). "Æthelwulf (d. 858), King of the West Saxons". Oxford Dictionary of National Biography. Oxford University Press. doi:10.1093/ref:odnb/8921. (subscription, Wikipedia Library access or UK public library membership required)
- Nelson, Janet (2008). "The First Use of the Second Anglo-Saxon Ordo". In Barrow, Julia; Wareham, Andrew (eds.). Myth, Rulership, Church and Charters. Aldershot, UK: Ashgate. ISBN 978-0-7546-5120-8.
- Rollason, David (2003). Northumbria 500–1100: Creation and Destruction of a Kingdom. Cambridge, UK: Cambridge University Press. ISBN 0-521-81335-2.
- Ryan, Martin J. (2013). "Conquest, Reform and the Making of England". In Higham, Nicholas J.; Ryan, Martin J. (eds.). The Anglo-Saxon World. New Haven, USA: Yale University Press. ISBN 978-0-300-12534-4.
- "S 356". The Electronic Sawyer: Online Catalogue of Anglo-Saxon Charters.
- Smith, Scott Thompson (2012). Land and Book: Literature and Land Tenure in Anglo-Saxon England. Toronto, Canada: University of Toronto Press. ISBN 978-1-4426-4486-1.
- Smyth, Alfred P. (1987). Scandinavian York and Dublin. Vol. 1. Dublin, Ireland: Irish Academic Press. ISBN 0-7165-2365-5.
- Smyth, Alfred P. (1995). King Alfred the Great. Oxford, UK: Oxford University Press. ISBN 0-19-822989-5.
- Stafford, Pauline (2008). "'The Annals of Æthelflæd': Annals, History and Politics in Early Tenth-Century England". In Barrow, Julia; Wareham, Andrew (eds.). Myth, Rulership, Church and Charters. Aldershot, UK: Ashgate. ISBN 978-0-7546-5120-8.
- Stenton, Frank M. (1971). Anglo-Saxon England (3rd ed.). Oxford, UK: Oxford University Press. ISBN 978-0-19-280139-5.
- Thacker, Alan (2001). "Dynastic Monasteries and Family Cults: Edward the Elder's Sainted Kindred". In Higham, N. J.; Hill, D. H. (eds.). Edward the Elder 899–924. Abingdon, UK: Routledge. ISBN 0-415-21497-1.
- Wainwright, F. T. (September 1945). "The Chronology of the 'Mercian Register'". English Historical Review. 60 (238): 385–392. ISSN 0013-8266.
- Williams, Ann (1979). Brown, R. Allen (ed.). "Some Notes and Considerations on Problems Connected with the English Royal Succession 860–1066". Proceedings of the Battle Conference on Anglo-Norman Studies. The Boydell Press. ISBN 0-85115-107-8.
- Williams, Ann (1991a). "Æthelwold Ætheling d. 903". In Williams, Ann; Smyth, Alfred P.; Kirby, D. P. (eds.). A Biographical Dictionary of Dark Age Britain. London, UK: Seaby. p. 33. ISBN 978-1-85264-047-7.
- Williams, Ann (1991b). "Burgred King of Mercia 852–874". In Williams, Ann; Smyth, Alfred P.; Kirby, D. P. (eds.). A Biographical Dictionary of Dark Age Britain. London, UK: Seaby. pp. 68–69. ISBN 978-1-85264-047-7.
- Woolf, Alex (2001). "View from the West: An Irish Perspective". In Higham, N. J.; Hill, D. H. (eds.). Edward the Elder 899–924. Abingdon, UK: Routledge. ISBN 0-415-21497-1.
- Wormald, Patrick (2001). "Kingship and Royal Property from Æthelwulf to Edward the Elder". In Higham, N. J.; Hill, D. H. (eds.). Edward the Elder 899–924. Abingdon, UK: Routledge. ISBN 0-415-21497-1.
- Yorke, Barbara (1988). "Æthelwold and the Politics of the Tenth Century". In Yorke, Barbara (ed.). Bishop Æthelwold: His Career and Influence. Woodbridge, UK: The Boydell Press. ISBN 978-0-85115-705-4.
- Yorke, Barbara (1995). Wessex in the Early Middle Ages. London, UK: Leicester University Press. ISBN 0-7185-1856-X.
- Yorke, Barbara (2001). "Edward as Ætheling". In Higham, N. J.; Hill, D. H. (eds.). Edward the Elder 899–924. Abingdon, UK: Routledge. ISBN 0-415-21497-1.
