= Eohric of East Anglia =

King of East Anglia from 890 to 902

Eohric

King of the East Angles
- Reign: 890 – 902
- Predecessor: Guthrum
- Successor: Æthelwold
- Died: 13 December 902

Eohric (died 902) was a Danish Viking king of East Anglia. The name Eohric is the Old English form of the Old Norse Eiríkr.

It would appear that Eohric became king of East Anglia following the death of King Guthrum in 890. Otherwise, little is known of Eohric or of the kingdom of East Anglia in his time. The Anglo-Saxon Chronicle recorded that an army from East Anglia raided Mercia and Wessex, and a West Saxon army raided East Anglia in retaliation. The Vikings met a section of the West Saxons at the Battle of the Holme on 13 December 902, and Eohric was killed.

== Background ==
A coin commemorating King Edmund the Martyr. These coins appear to have been common in Eohric's time.

East Anglia had been attacked by the Viking Great Heathen Army in around 869 and Edmund (later known as Edmund the Martyr) was killed by the Vikings. After Edmund's death, East Anglia was ruled by Oswald and Æthelred (II), both of whom are known only from the evidence of a few coins. Their successor Guthrum, who fought against Alfred the Great, king of Wessex, appears to have been king of East Anglia in the 880s and issued coins in his own name. Guthrum died circa 890 and Eohric succeeded him as king.

== Death in battle ==
A map of the places associated with the events of 905, according to the Anglo-Saxon Chronicle.

Eohric was amongst the supporters of the ætheling Æthelwold in his struggle against Edward the Elder. The Anglo-Saxon Chronicle recorded in its entry under the year 905, probably to be dated to between 902 or 904, that some time after October of that year Æthelwold and Eohric were with an East Anglian army which raided over the River Thames into Edward's lands. Edward took an army into East Anglia, ravaging as far north as the Devil's Dyke and the River Wissey. When Edward ordered a retreat the men of Kent disobeyed, and met the East Anglians at the Battle of the Holme. The Vikings were victorious but Eohric and Æthelwold were both killed.

The history of East Anglia after Eohric remained obscure until the conquest of the region by Edward the Elder.

== Footnotes ==
English royalty
Preceded by Guthrum I	King of East Anglia; 890– 902	Succeeded by Æthelwold / Guthrum II
