= Tremissis =

Small solid gold coin of Late Antiquity

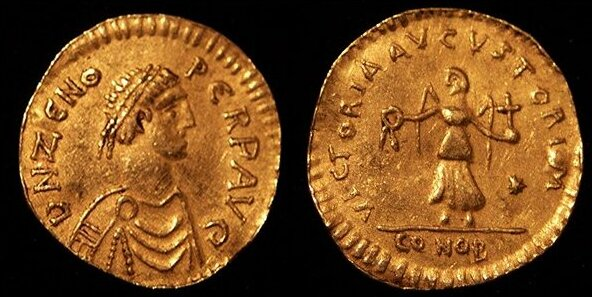
Tremissis from Constantinople in the second reign of Zeno

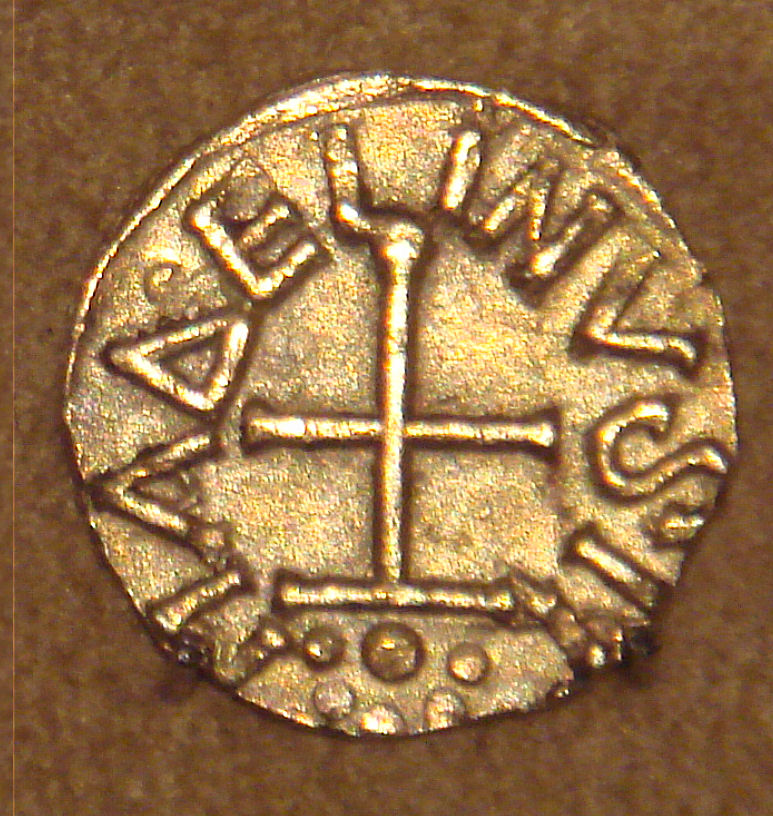
Frankish gold Tremissis with Christian cross, issued by minter Madelinus, Dorestad, Netherlands, mid-600s

The tremissis or tremis (Greek: τριμίσιον, trimision) was a small pure gold coin of Late Antiquity. Its name, meaning "a third of a unit", formed by analogy with semissis (half of a unit), indicated its value relative to the solidus. It was introduced into Roman currency in the 380s by the Emperor Theodosius I and initially weighed 8 siliquae (1.52 grams).

Roman tremisses were commonly minted into the reign of Leo III (717–741), but after that they were only rarely struck in the east of the empire, probably only for ceremonial uses, until the reign of Basil I (867–886), after which they disappeared. Nevertheless, the coin continued in common use in the Sicilian theme until the fall of Syracuse in 878. The trachy, introduced in the 11th century, was equivalent in value to the old tremissis. Although it was not made of gold, it was one third of the standard golden hyperpyron. It was not, however, called tremissis.

Outside of the Roman empire, tremisses were minted by the Anglo-Saxons, Burgundians, Franks, Frisians, Lombards, Ostrogoths, Suevi and Visigoths between the 5th and 8th centuries. The word tremissis was borrowed into Old English as thrymsa.

In Frankish sources, the tremissis is sometimes called a triens, a term likewise meaning "a third", which originally referred to a bronze coin worth a third of an as. The historian and bishop Gregory of Tours calls the Frankish tremissis a trians or treans. The German form dremise is also attested. In French historiography the term tiers (third) or tiers de sou (third of a solidus) is often used. The French, in general, prefer to call the coin of the Merovingian kings a triens (but avoiding the plural form trientes), while British scholarship prefers tremissis.

It was still used as an accounting currency until at least the 12th century in Sardinia. It appears as tremisse in the condaghe.
