= Hold (title) =

Hold (or Hauld) was a title of nobility, used in early medieval Scandinavia and the English Danelaw.

== History ==
Holds were described as "noblemen of exalted rank" in Viking Northumbria by Frank Stenton, with a wergild of 4000 thrymsas, equivalent to a king's high-reeve. Hold is described as a title just below the earl in Oxford Dictionary of Surnames.
