= Thrymsa =

Gold coin

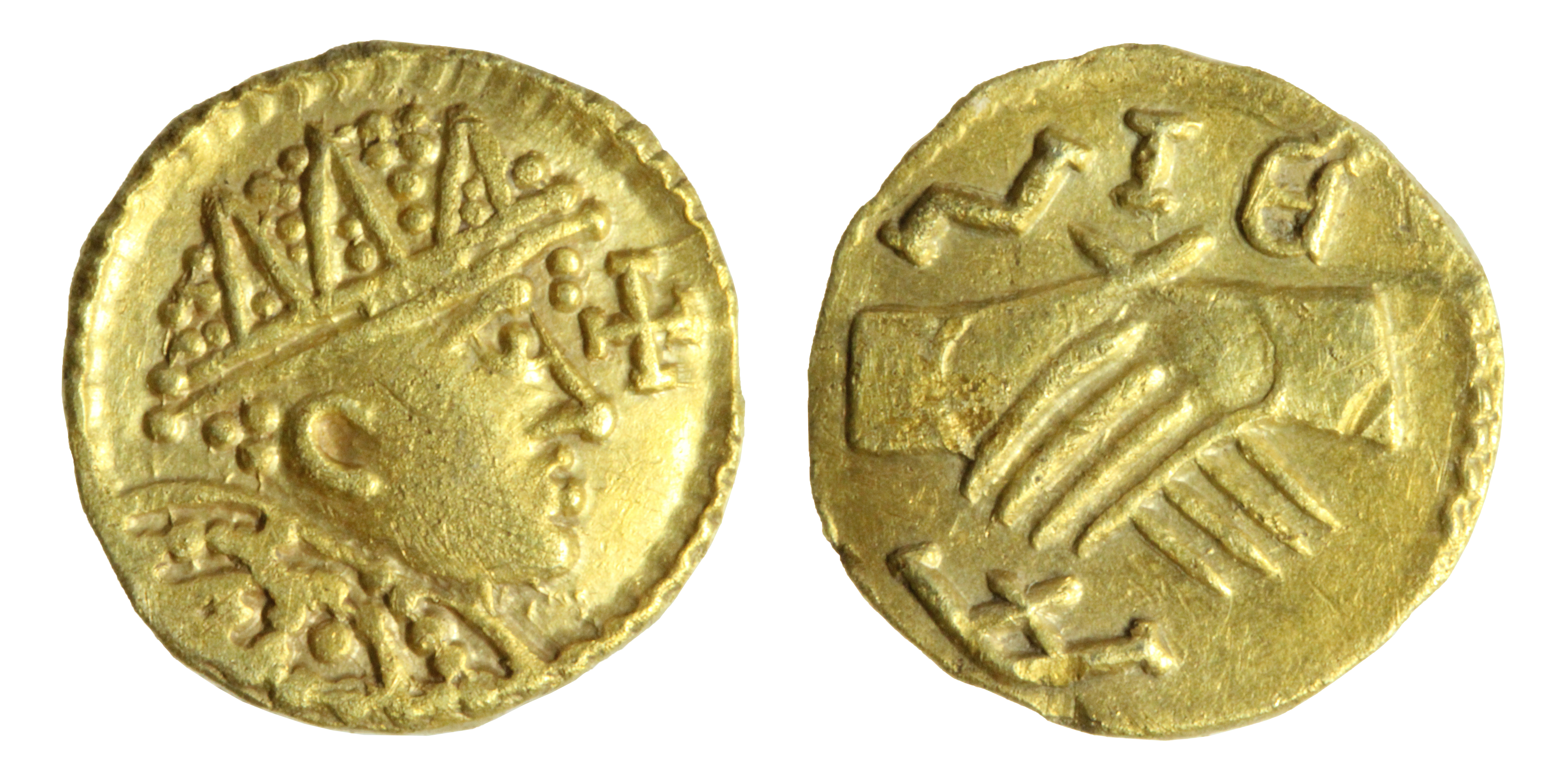
An early medieval Anglo-Saxon gold thrymsa (or shilling) coin from c. 650–675 AD

The thrymsa (Old English: þrymsa) was a gold coin minted in seventh-century Anglo-Saxon England. It originated as a copy of Merovingian tremisses and earlier Roman coins with a high gold content. Continued debasement between the 630s and the 650s reduced the gold content in newly minted coins such that after c. 655 the percentage of gold in a new coin was less than 35%. The thrymsa ceased to be minted after about 675 and was superseded by the silver sceat.

== History ==
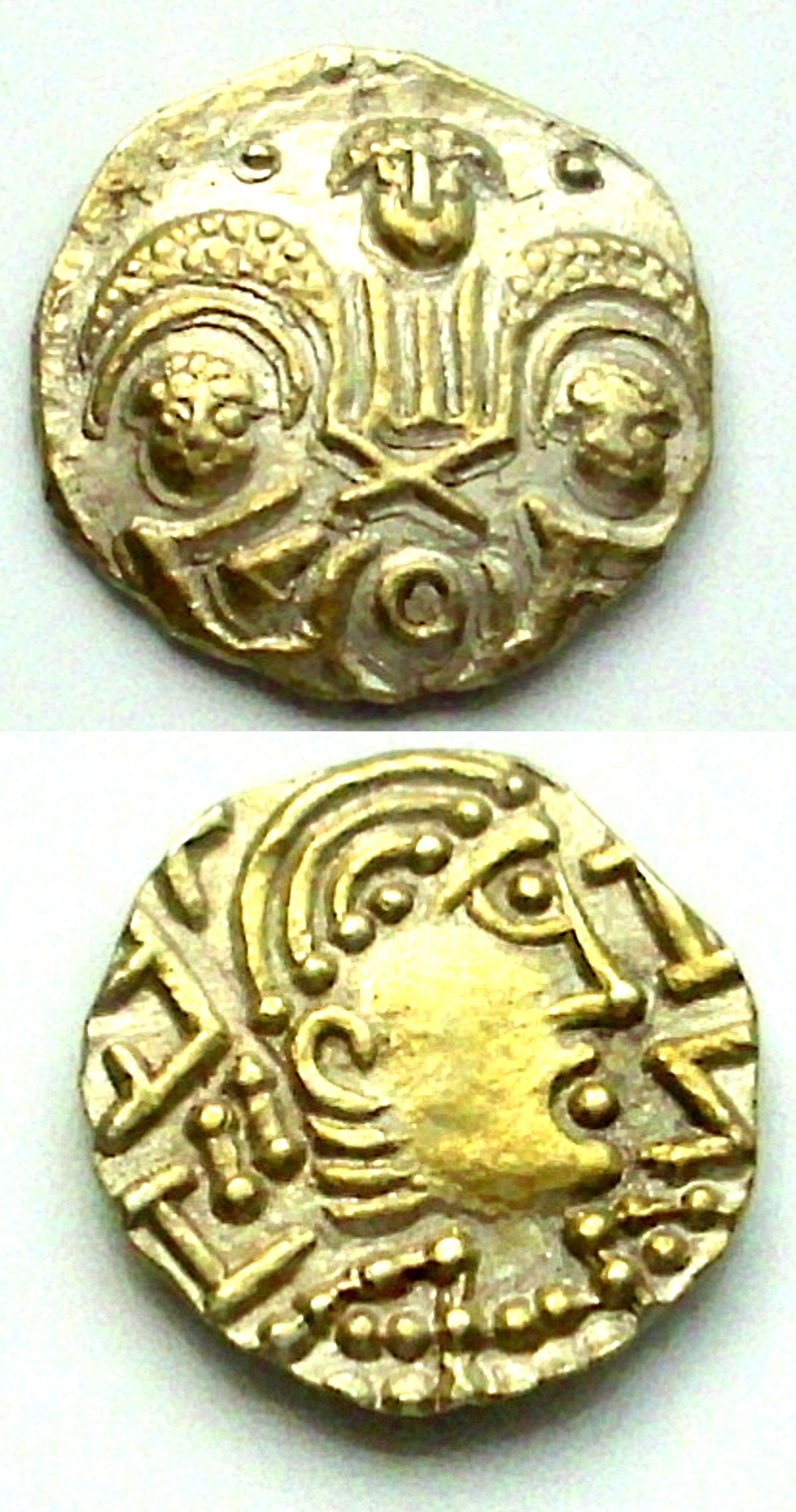
Gold thrymsa with a figure of Victory enfolding the heads of two small figures. c. 655–675 AD

The first thrymsas were minted in England in the 630s. These earliest coins were created at mints in Canterbury, London, and perhaps also Winchester. Charles Arnold-Baker in his Companion to British History suggests that the impetus for the creation of this coin was increased commerce following the marriage of Æthelberht of Kent and Bertha of Kent, a daughter of the Frankish king Charibert I. Thrymsas originally contained between 40% and 70% gold, but following continued debasement those coins minted after c. 655 contained less than 35% gold. Gold coins ceased to be minted completely by about 675, after which the silver sceat was minted instead. The term thrymsa is used in later Anglo-Saxon texts to refer to a value of four silver pennies. Thrymsas are known to modern numismatists through their discovery in various hoards, notably the Crondall Hoard. The ship-burial at Sutton Hoo, which dates from the early seventh-century, contained 37 Merovingian tremisses but no Anglo-Saxon coins. (Note: If the identity of the figure buried there is indeed Rædwald of East Anglia as is generally considered then that would give a date before 627 for the burial.) The Crondall hoard by contrast, dated to after c. 630, contained 101 gold coins, of which 69 were Anglo-Saxon and 24 were Merovingian or Frankish.

== Design ==
Early thrymsas were imitations of Merovingian (Frankish) tremisses or earlier Roman coins. They weighed between 1 and 3 grams (0.03–0.1 troy oz), and had a diameter of approximately 13 mm (1/2 inch). Later thrymsas feature various different designs, including busts, crosses, lyre-like objects and Aquila ensigns. Inscriptions are also common features, and sometimes appear in Latin script and sometimes in Anglo-Saxon runes.

== See also ==
- History of the English penny (c. 600 – 1066)
- Coinage in Anglo-Saxon England

== Gallery ==
Comparison of continental and English coins:

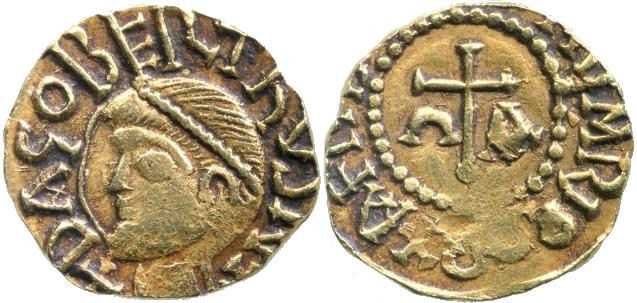
Tremissis of a Frankish king Dagobert I (c. 603–639 AD)

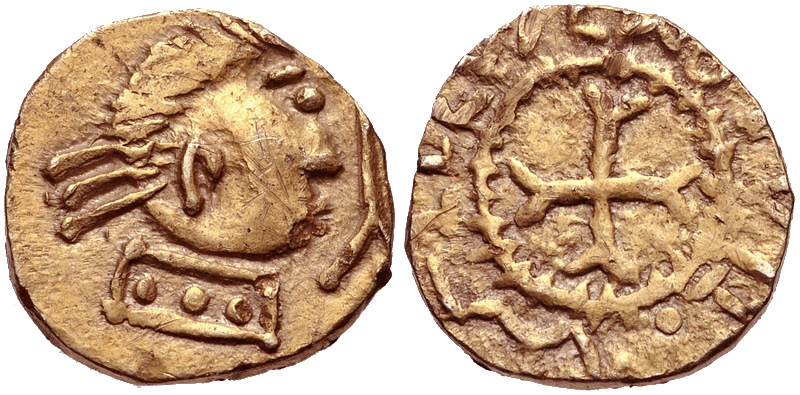
Gold Thrymsa c. 620–645 AD from the Crondall hoard in Hampshire

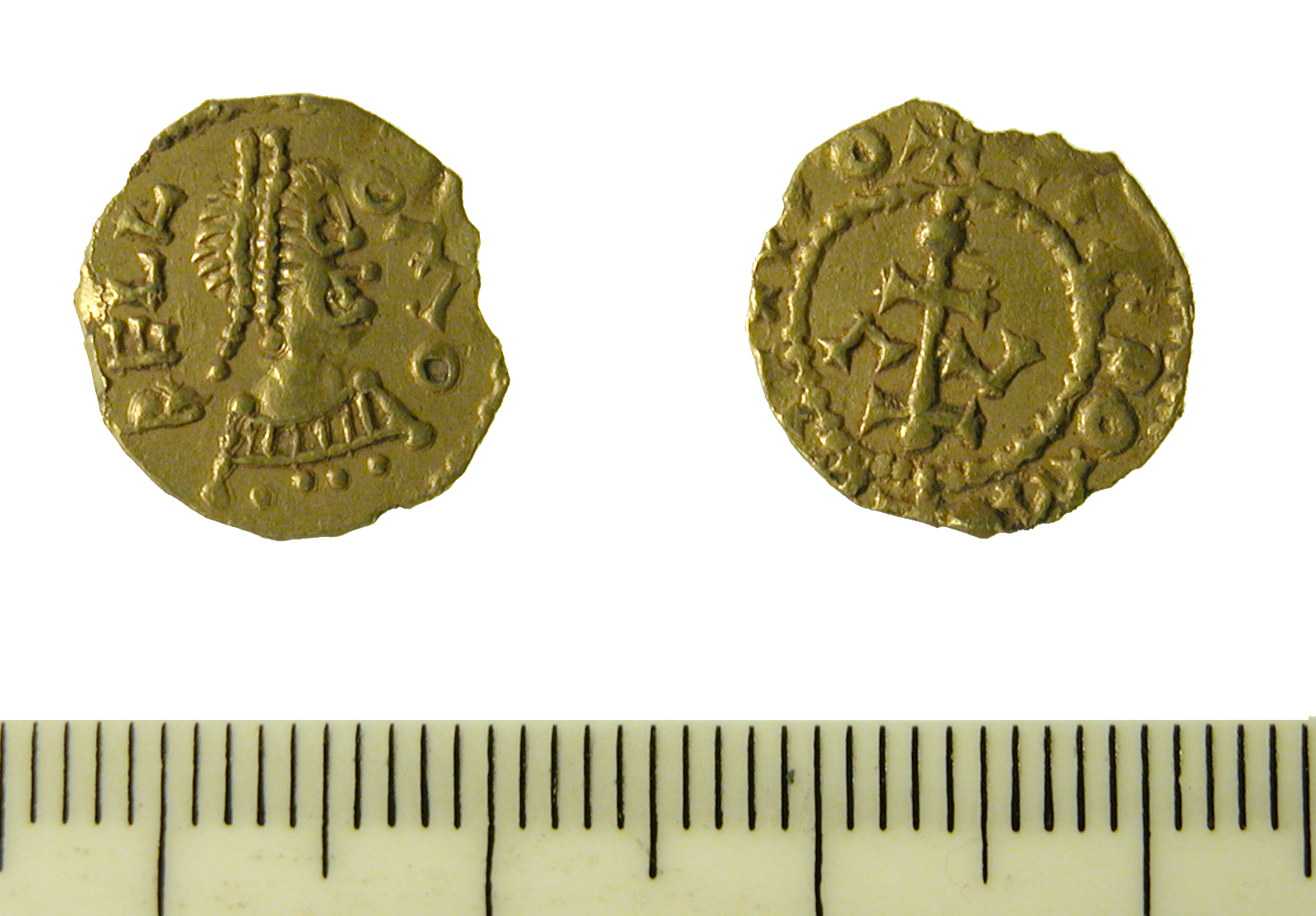
Thrymsa found in Suffolk, c. 500–675

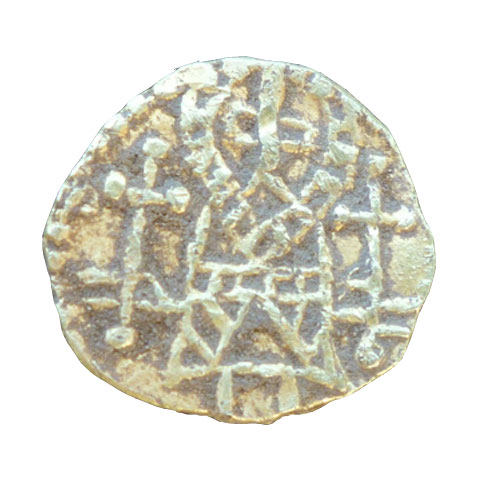
York thrymsa, metal-detected find
